As of October 5, 2021, the Catholic Church in its entirety comprises 3,171 ecclesiastical jurisdictions, including over 652 archdioceses and 2,248 dioceses, as well as apostolic vicariates, apostolic exarchates, apostolic administrations, apostolic prefectures, military ordinariates, personal ordinariates, personal prelatures, territorial prelatures, territorial abbacies and missions sui juris around the world.

In addition to these jurisdictions, there are 2,100 titular sees (bishoprics, archbishoprics and metropolitanates).

This is a structural list to show the relationships of each diocese to one another, grouped by ecclesiastical province, within each episcopal conference, within each continent or other geographical area.

The list needs regular updating and is incomplete, but as articles are written, more will be added, and various aspects need to be regularly updated.

Map

Types of Catholic dioceses 
This refers to Catholic dioceses in the world, of all (Latin or Eastern) Churches, .

Additional types, exclusively for the Eastern Churches, Ordinariate Use and Extraordinary Form

Exempt Catholic Dioceses (directly subject to the Holy See) 

These (arch)dioceses are exempt from belonging to any ecclesiastical province, hence only the Vatican can exert the authority and coordinating functions normally falling to the Metropolitan Archbishop. They are grouped here geographically. Nevertheless, most belong to an episcopal conference, in which case the more relevant mention is in its geographical region, as exempt dioceses as such do not have specific ties with each other.
 Military Ordinariates are in pastoral charge of the troops of a state, but may be vested in a Metropolitan Archbishop, typically in the national capital.
 Also generally exempt are the Apostolic prefectures and Apostolic vicariates, which tend to be temporary missionary dioceses, expected to become part of an ecclesiastical province when promoted to regular (arch- or suffragan) bishopric.
 The Personal Ordinariates for former Anglicans (who left the Anglican Communion for communion with the Holy See) are allowed to use the Ordinariate Use, which is counted as a variant usage of the Roman Rite (unlike the Eastern churches' five distinct rites).
 Eastern Ordinariates are in pastoral charge of all Eastern Churches, of only those of Byzantine Rite or even just of the Armenian Rite, in one or more states of various Catholic churches without any proper diocese there, but are usually vested in a Roman Catholic Metropolitan Archbishop, often in the capital.
 Disregarded are many episcopal or archiepiscopal prelates in the Roman Curia, as their dicasteries don't constitute dioceses, although many posts there require by law or custom a bishop or an archbishop (usually titular), just as the Vatican's diplomatic posts in nearly every national capital.

Universal or transcontinental exempt dioceses (not counting minor dependencies) 
 The personal prelature (a unique status) of Opus Dei, with a cathedral see (Santa Maria della Pace ai Parioli) in Rome, ranking as bishopric.
 The  transcontinental Apostolic Administration of the Caucasus covering both Georgia (including breakaway self-declared states Abkhazia and South Ossetia) and Armenia, with cathedral see at Tbilisi (Georgia).
 The Personal Ordinariate of Our Lady of the Southern Cross (for former Anglicans in Australia and Japan).

European exempt dioceses 
 in Italy:
 some (arch)bishoprics under the papal Metropolitan see at Rome, including
 Military Ordinariate of Italy, cumulated with varying sees
 Archdiocese of Lucca
 Territorial Abbey of Montecassino, whose cathedral see is a minor basilica
 Territorial Abbacy of Monte Oliveto Maggiore, with cathedral see in Siena, seat of the abbot-general of the Olivetans (a Benedictine congregation)
 formerly the Territorial Abbey of San Paolo fuori le Mura (since 2005, just an abbey, territory incorporated into the diocese of Rome)
 Territorial Abbacy of Subiaco, whose cathedral see and co-cathedral are minor basilicas
 Italo-Albanese Territorial Abbacy of Santa Maria di Grottaferrata, only non-Latin Church territorial abbey: Italo-Albanese Catholic rite
 Italo-Albanese Diocese of Piana degli Albanesi, with cathedral see at Palermo, on Sicily
 Italo-Albanese Diocese of Lungro, with cathedral see at Lungro, near Cosenza in Calabria
 in Austria:
 Ordinariate for Byzantine-rite Catholics in Austria, vested in the Metropolitan Archbishop of capital Vienna
 Military Ordinariate of Austria, not vested in any see
 in Belgium: Military Ordinariate of Belgium, vested in the primatial Metropolitan Archbishop of Mechelen-Brussels
 in Bosnia and Herzegovina: Military Ordinariate of Bosnia and Herzegovina, not vested in any see
 in Bulgaria:
 Diocese of Nicopoli
 Diocese of Sofia and Plovdiv
Bulgarian Catholic Apostolic Exarchate of Sofia
 in Croatia:
 Archdiocese of Zadar
 Military Ordinariate of Croatia, not vested in any see
 in the Czech Republic:
 Ruthenian Apostolic Exarchate of Czech Republic
 in and for all Denmark: Diocese of Copenhagen, including its overseas territories Greenland and the Faroe Islands
 in and for all Estonia: Apostolic Administration of Estonia (at Tallinn),
 Finland, including the autonomous region of Åland: Diocese of Helsinki
 in France:
 Military Ordinariate of France
 Archdiocese of Strasbourg
 Diocese of Metz
 Ordinariate for Eastern Catholics in France, vested in the Metropolitan Archbishop of capital Paris, for remaining Eastern Churches
 in Germany
 Military Ordinariate of Germany, cumulated with varying sees
 Apostolic Exarchate in Germany and Scandinavia for the Ukrainians, with cathedral see in Munich (Bavaria); also for Nordic countries: Denmark, Finland, Norway and Sweden
 in and for all Gibraltar: Diocese of Gibraltar
 in Greece:
 Archdiocese of Athens
 Archdiocese of Rhodos
 Archdiocese of Corfu, Zakynthos and Cephalonia, on the Ionian Islands
 Apostolic Vicariate of Thessaloniki
 Ordinariate for Armenian Catholics in Greece
 Greek Catholic Apostolic Exarchate of Greece, with cathedral see in Athens, for the Greek Catholic particular Eastern church
 in Hungary:
 Military Ordinariate of Hungary, not vested in any see
 Territorial Abbacy of Pannonhalma, whose abbatial cathedral see is a minor basilica
 in and for all Iceland: Diocese of Reykjavík
 in Kosovo:
 Diocese of Prizren-Priština, for all Kosovo
 cfr. Serbia for the Catholics of Byzantine Rite
 in and for all the principality of Liechtenstein: Archdiocese of Vaduz
 in Lithuania: Military Ordinariate of Lithuania
 in and for all the Grand duchy of Luxemburg: Archdiocese of Luxembourg
 in and for all Moldova (Moldavia): Diocese of Chişinău
 in and for all the principality of Monaco: Archdiocese of Monaco
 in Montenegro: Archdiocese of Bar
 in the Netherlands: Military Ordinariate of the Netherlands, cumulated with varying sees
 in North Macedonia: Macedonian Catholic Eparchy of the Assumption of the Blessed Virgin Mary in Strumica-Skopje
 in Norway:
 Diocese of Oslo for most of Norway plus its Arctic territories Svalbard and Jan Mayen and uninhabited Bouvet Island
 Territorial Prelature of Trondheim
 Territorial Prelature of Tromsø
 in Poland:
 Ordinariate for Eastern Catholics in Poland, for all Eastern Churches, vested in the Metropolitan Archbishop of capital Warszaw
 Military Ordinariate of Poland
 in Portugal: Military Ordinariate of Portugal, not vested in any see
 in Romania:
 Archdiocese of Alba Iulia
 Ordinariate for Armenian Catholics in Romania
 in Russia (cfr. infra Eastern Europe & Asia):
 Russian Catholic Apostolic Exarchate of Russia, vacant since 1951
 in Sweden: Diocese of Stockholm
 in Serbia: Byzantine Catholic Eparchy of Saint Nicholas of Ruski Krstur, for Catholics of Byzantine Rite in Serbia 
 Military Ordinariate of Slovakia, not vested in any see
 Military Ordinariate of Spain, ranking as archbishop, cumulated with varying sees
 in Switzerland, all diocesan sees (joined in a national episcopal conference, without province):
 Diocese of Basel
 Diocese of Chur
 Diocese of Lausanne, Geneva and Fribourg
 Diocese of Lugano
 Diocese of Sankt Gallen
 Diocese of Sion (Sitten)
 Territorial Abbacy of Maria Einsiedeln
 Territorial Abbacy of Saint-Maurice d’Agaune
 in the UK:
 Military Ordinariate of Great-Britain for UK-based troops, being joint for both UK provinces England & Wales and Scotland
 Personal Ordinariate of Our Lady of Walsingham (for former Anglicans in England and Wales and in Scotland)
 Syro-Malabar Catholic Eparchy of Great Britain (England, Scotland & Wales)
 Ordinariate for Armenian Catholics in Eastern Europe, actually only for Armenia, Georgia (country), Russia and Ukraine

Asian exempt dioceses 
 Latin Patriarchate of Jerusalem, for all of the Holy Land (Palestine & Israel), Jordan and Cyprus
 Apostolic Vicariate of Aleppo, for all of Syria
 Apostolic Vicariate of Beirut, for all of Lebanon
 Apostolic Vicariate of Northern Arabia, in Kuwait City, for all of Kuwait, Bahrain, Saudi Arabia and Qatar
 Apostolic Vicariate of Southern Arabia, in Abu Dhabi (UAE), for all of Oman, United Arab Emirates and Yemen
 Roman Catholic Archdiocese of Baghdad, covering Iraq
 Apostolic Vicariate of Brunei Darussalam, covering Brunei
 all dioceses in Cambodia (joined in a common episcopal conference with Laos):
 Apostolic Vicariate of Phnom Penh
 Apostolic Prefecture of Battambang
 Apostolic Prefecture of Kompong Cham
 in China:
 Diocese of Macau
 Apostolic Prefecture of Baoqing (Paoking/ Shaoyang)
 Apostolic Prefecture of Guilin (Kweilin)
 Apostolic Prefecture of Hainan
 Apostolic Prefecture of Haizhou (Donghai/ Haichow)
 Apostolic Prefecture of Jiamusi (Kiamusze)
 Apostolic Prefecture of Jian’ou (Jianning/ Kienning/ Kienow)
 Apostolic Prefecture of Lindong (Lintung)
 Apostolic Prefecture of Linqing (Lintsing)
 Apostolic Prefecture of Lixian (Lizhou/ Lichow)
 Apostolic Prefecture of Qiqihar (Tsitsikar)
 Apostolic Prefecture of Shaowu
 Apostolic Prefecture of Shashi (Shasi)
 Apostolic Prefecture of Shiqian (Shihtsien)
 Apostolic Prefecture of Suixian (Suihsien)
 Apostolic Prefecture of Tongzhou (Tungchow)
 Apostolic Prefecture of Tunxi (Tunki)
 Apostolic Prefecture of Weihai (Weihaiwei)
 Apostolic Prefecture of Xiangtan (Siangtan)
 Apostolic Prefecture of Xing’anfu (Ankang/ Hinganfu)
 Apostolic Prefecture of Xining (Sining)
 Apostolic Prefecture of Xinjiang (Jiangzhou/ Kiangchow)
 Apostolic Prefecture of Xinjiang-Urumqi (Urumqi/ Sinkiang/ Xinjiang)
 Apostolic Prefecture of Xinxiang (Sinsiang)
 Apostolic Prefecture of Yangzhou (Yangchow)
 Apostolic Prefecture of Yiduxian (Iduhsien)
 Apostolic Prefecture of Yixian (Yihsien)
 Apostolic Prefecture of Yongzhou (Lingling/ Yungchow)
 Apostolic Prefecture of Yueyang (Yuezhou/ Yochow)
 Apostolic Prefecture of Zhaotong (Chaotung)
 Russian Catholic Apostolic Exarchate of Harbin, with former cathedral see in Harbin
 in India:
 Syro-Malabar Catholic Eparchy of Faridabad, see near Delhi, also serves Haryana, Punjab, Himachal Pradesh, Jammu and Kashmir and parts of Uttar Pradesh
 Syro-Malabar Catholic Eparchy of Hosur
 Syro-Malabar Catholic Eparchy of Shamshabad
 Syro-Malankara Catholic Eparchy of Gurgaon, see located near Delhi, serving 22 states of India
 in Indonesia: Military Ordinariate of Indonesia
 in and for all Iran (Persia): Archdiocese of Teheran-Isfahan
 Personal Ordinariate of Our Lady of the Southern Cross (for former Anglicans in Australia and Japan).
 in Korea (North and South):
 Military Ordinariate of South Korea
 Territorial Abbacy of Tŏkwon, alias Tŏkugen abbey, with a cathedral see, in North Korea
 all dioceses in Laos (joined in a common episcopal conference with Cambodia):
 Apostolic Vicariate of Luang Prabang
 Apostolic Vicariate of Pakse
 Apostolic Vicariate of Savannakhet
 Apostolic Vicariate of Vientiane
  in the Philippines:
 Military Ordinariate of the Philippines
 Apostolic Vicariate of Bontoc-Lagawe
 Apostolic Vicariate of Calapan
 Apostolic Vicariate of Jolo
 Apostolic Vicariate of Puerto Princesa
 Apostolic Vicariate of San Jose in Mindoro
 Apostolic Vicariate of Tabuk
 Apostolic Vicariate of Taytay
 in Pakistan: Apostolic Vicariate of Quetta
 in Russia (cfr. Europe): Apostolic Prefecture of Yuzhno Sakhalinsk, on Sakhalin island off eastern Siberia
 in and for all Singapore: Archdiocese of Singapore
 in Turkey:
 Greek Catholic Apostolic Exarchate of Istanbul, with see in Istanbul, for all Turkey

New World exempt dioceses 
 in Argentina:
 Military Ordinariate of Argentina
 Ordinariate for Eastern Catholics in Argentina, for all Eastern Churches, vested in the Latin Church Metropolitan Archbishop of capital Buenos Aires
 in Australia:
 Military Ordinariate of Australia
 Archdiocese of Canberra and Goulburn
 Archdiocese of Hobart
 Personal Ordinariate of Our Lady of the Southern Cross (for former Anglicans in Australia and Japan, with cathedral see in Melbourne, Australia).
 in Bolivia:
 Military Ordinariate of Bolivia
 Apostolic Vicariate of Camiri
 Apostolic Vicariate of El Beni
 Apostolic Vicariate of Ñuflo de Chávez
 Apostolic Vicariate of Pando
 Apostolic Vicariate of Reyes
 in Brazil:
 Military Ordinariate of Brazil
 Ordinariate for Eastern Catholics in Brazil, for all Eastern Churches, cumulated with various Latin Church Metropolitan sees
 Personal Apostolic Administration of São João Maria Vianney, cumulated with Diocese of Campos
 in Canada:
 Military Ordinariate of Canada
 Archdiocese of Winnipeg
 Syriac Catholic Apostolic Exarchate of Canada (Antiochian Rite), with cathedral see at Montréal, Québec
 in Chile:
 Military Ordinariate of Chile
 Apostolic Vicariate of Aysén
 in Colombia:
 Military Ordinariate of Colombia
 Apostolic Vicariate of Guapi
 Apostolic Vicariate of Inírida
 Apostolic Vicariate of Leticia
 Apostolic Vicariate of Mitú
 Apostolic Vicariate of Puerto Carreño
 Apostolic Vicariate of Puerto Leguízamo–Solano
 Apostolic Vicariate of Puerto Carreño
 Apostolic Vicariate of San Andrés y Providencia
 Apostolic Vicariate of San Vicente del Caguán
 Apostolic Vicariate of Tierradentro
 Apostolic Vicariate of Trinidad
 in Dominican Republic: Military Ordinariate of Dominican Republic
 in Ecuador:
 Military Ordinariate of Ecuador
 Apostolic Vicariate of Aguarico
 Apostolic Vicariate of Esmeraldas
 Apostolic Vicariate of Galápagos
 Apostolic Vicariate of Méndez
 Apostolic Vicariate of Napo
 Apostolic Vicariate of Puyo
 Apostolic Vicariate of San Miguel de Sucumbíos
 Apostolic Vicariate of Zamora in Ecuador
 in El Salvador: Military Ordinariate of El Salvador
 Apostolic Prefecture of Falkland Islands, for the Southern Atlantic UK overseas territories Falkland Islands (Malvinas) and South Georgia and the South Sandwich Islands
 in New Zealand: Military Ordinariate of New Zealand
 in Paraguay:
 Military Ordinariate of Paraguay
 Apostolic Vicariate of Chaco Paraguayo
 Apostolic Vicariate of Pilcomayo
 in Peru:
 Military Ordinariate of Peru
 Apostolic Vicariate of Iquitos
 Apostolic Vicariate of Jaén in Peru
 Apostolic Vicariate of Pucallpa
 Apostolic Vicariate of Puerto Maldonado
 Apostolic Vicariate of Requena
 Apostolic Vicariate of San José de Amazonas
 Apostolic Vicariate of San Ramón
 Apostolic Vicariate of Yurimaguas
 in Tonga: 
 Diocese of Tonga
 in the United States:
 Military Ordinariate of the United States: Archdiocese for the Military Services, USA
 Personal Ordinariate of the Chair of Saint Peter, with see in Houston, Texas (for former Anglicans in the United States and in Canada)
 Romanian Catholic Eparchy of St George's in Canton, bishopric for the diaspora in North America (also Canada), with cathedral see in Canton, Ohio (USA)
 Syro-Malankara Catholic Eparchy of St. Mary, Queen of Peace, of the United States of America and Canada, with cathedral see at Elmont, New York
 in Venezuela:
 Military Ordinariate of Venezuela
 Apostolic Vicariate of Caroní
 Apostolic Vicariate of Puerto Ayacucho
 Apostolic Vicariate of Tucupita
 Melkite Greek Catholic Apostolic Exarchate of Venezuela (Byzantine Rite), with cathedral see in Caracas
 Syriac Catholic Apostolic Exarchate of Venezuela (Antiochian Rite), with cathedral see at Maracay, Aragua

African exempt dioceses 
 in Algeria: Diocese of Laghouat
 in Chad: Apostolic Vicariate of Mongo
 in Cape Verde:
 Diocese of Mindelo
 Diocese of Santiago de Cabo Verde
 in and for all the Comoros, also for Mayotte: Apostolic Vicariate of Comoros Archipelago
 in and for all Djibouti: Diocese of Djibouti
 in Ethiopia, where all Latin circonscriptions are missionary:
 Apostolic Vicariate of Awasa
 Apostolic Vicariate of Gambella
 Apostolic Vicariate of Harar
 Apostolic Vicariate of Hosanna
 Apostolic Vicariate of Jimma-Bonga, at Jimma
 Apostolic Vicariate of Meki
 Apostolic Vicariate of Nekemte
 Apostolic Vicariate of Soddo
 Apostolic Prefecture of Robe
 in Gabon: Apostolic Vicariate of Makokou
 in and for all The Gambia: Diocese of Banjul
 in Guinea-Bissau:
 Diocese of Bafatá
 Diocese of Bissau
 in Kenya:
 Military Ordinariate of Kenya
 Apostolic Vicariate of Isiolo
 in Libya:
 Apostolic Vicariate of Benghazi
 Apostolic Vicariate of Derna
 Apostolic Vicariate of Tripoli
 Apostolic Prefecture of Misurata
 in and for all Mauritania: Diocese of Nouakchott
 on and for all Mauritius: Diocese of Port-Louis
 in Morocco:
 Archdiocese of Rabat
 Archdiocese of Tanger
 on and for all the French territory Réunion: Diocese of Saint-Denis-de-La Réunion
 in Nigeria:
 Maronite Apostolic Exarchate of Western and Central Africa, with cathedral see Church of Our Lady of the Annunciation, in Ibadan, Oyo state
  in and for all São Tomé and Príncipe: Diocese of São Tomé and Príncipe
 on and for all the Seychelles: Diocese of Port Victoria o Seychelles
 in and for all Somalia: Diocese of Mogadiscio
 in South Africa:
 Military Ordinariate of South Africa
 Apostolic Vicariate of Ingwavuma
 in and for all Tunisia: Archdiocese of Tunis
 in Uganda: Military Ordinariate of Uganda
 in and for all Western Sahara: Apostolic Prefecture of Western Sahara

Europe (Latin and Eastern Churches) 

There are also 'meetings of episcopal conferences' for the (arch)bishops from countries belonging to:
 European Union
 Council of Europe

Exempt dioceses in European countries without ecclesiastical province or national conference 

 Exempt (arch)dioceses, directly subject to the Holy See, each for a whole small country
 Archdiocese of Vaduz, for Liechtenstein
 Archdiocese of Luxembourg, for Luxembourg
 Archdiocese of Monaco, for Monaco
 Apostolic Administration of Estonia (at Tallinn), for all Estonia
 Diocese of Chişinău, for all Moldova (Moldavia)
 Diocese of Prizren-Priština, for all Kosovo

Episcopal Conference of Austria 

Exempt dioceses, immediately subject to the Holy See
 Military Ordinariate of Austria, not vested in any see
 Territorial Abbacy of Wettingen-Mehrerau
 Ordinariate for Byzantine-rite Catholics in Austria, vested in the (Latin Church) Metropolitan Archbishop of capital Vienna, for  Byzantine Rite Eastern Catholic churches

Ecclesiastical Province of Salzburg
 Metropolitan Archdiocese of Salzburg, primatial see of Austria, a former prince-bishopric
 Diocese of Feldkirch
 Diocese of Graz-Seckau
 Diocese of Gurk
 Diocese of Innsbruck

Ecclesiastical Province of Vienna
 Metropolitan Archdiocese of Vienna
 Diocese of Eisenstadt
 Diocese of Linz
 Diocese of Sankt Pölten

Episcopal Conference of Belgium 

 Exempt, immediately subject to the Holy See
 Military Ordinariate of Belgium, ranking as bishopric, vested in the primatial Metropolitan see of Mechelen-Brussels
 For the Ukrainian Catholics, see France

Ecclesiastical Province of Mechelen-Brussels, covering Belgium
 Metropolitan Archdiocese of Mechelen-Brussels, primatial see of Belgium
 Diocese of Antwerp
 Diocese of Bruges
 Diocese of Ghent
 Diocese of Hasselt
 Diocese of Liège
 Diocese of Namur
 Diocese of Tournai

Episcopal Conference of England and Wales (parts of the UK)

 also comprises - without separate dioceses - three European insular crown dependencies of the Isle of Man, Jersey and Guernsey

Exempt dioceses
 the Bishopric of the Forces in Great Britain (for UK-based troops, joint with Scotland)
 Personal Ordinariate of Our Lady of Walsingham (for former Anglicans in England and Wales and in Scotland)
 Ukrainian Catholic Eparchy of the Holy Family of London (for the Ukrainian Catholics in Great Britain, with cathedral see in London, for the whole UK, including Scotland)
 Syro-Malabar Catholic Eparchy of Great Britain (for the Syro-Malabar Catholics in Great Britain, with cathedral see in Preston, for the whole UK, without Northern Ireland)
 Diocese of Gibraltar, for Gibraltar (British crown colony)
 Apostolic Prefecture of Falkland Islands, for the Southern Atlantic UK overseas territories Falkland Islands and South Georgia and the South Sandwich Islands
Mission sui juris of Saint Helena, Ascension and Tristan da Cunha; vested in the exempt, South American Apostolic Prefecture of the Falkland Islands

Ecclesiastical province of Birmingham
 Metropolitan Archdiocese of Birmingham
Diocese of Clifton
Diocese of Shrewsbury

Ecclesiastical province of Cardiff, for Wales
 Metropolitan Archdiocese of Cardiff (including Herefordshire in England)
Diocese of Menevia
Diocese of Wrexham

Ecclesiastical province of Liverpool
 Metropolitan Archdiocese of Liverpool, also covers the isle of Man crown dependency
Diocese of Hallam
Diocese of Hexham and Newcastle
Diocese of Lancaster
Diocese of Leeds
Diocese of Middlesbrough
Diocese of Salford

Ecclesiastical province of Southwark
 Metropolitan Archdiocese of Southwark
Diocese of Arundel and Brighton
Diocese of Plymouth
Diocese of Portsmouth, also covers both Anglo-Norman Channel Islands crown dependencies: Jersey and Guernsey

Ecclesiastical province of Westminster
 Metropolitan Diocese of Westminster
Diocese of Brentwood
Diocese of East Anglia
Diocese of Northampton
Diocese of Nottingham

Episcopal Conference of France 

(The ecclesiastical provinces' corresponding administrative regions are mentioned in parenthesis)
For overseas French dioceses, see under their continents and Episcopal conferences of Antilles (Central America) and Pacific (Oceania)

Exempt Latin dioceses, directly subject to the Holy See
 Military Ordinariate of France
 Archdiocese of Strasbourg
 Diocese of Metz
Eastern Church dioceses, directly subject to the Holy See (exempt) or to their particular church's Patriarch or Major Archbishop
 Armenian Catholic Diocese of Sainte-Croix-de-Paris, Eparchy with cathedral see in Paris, in and for France, immediately subject to the Patriarch of Cilicia, but not part of his province
 Maronite Eparchy of Notre-Dame du Liban de Paris, with cathedral see Cathédrale Notre-Dame du Liban, Paris, immediately subject to the Patriarch of Cilicia, but not part of his province; also Apostolic Visitor in Western and Northern Europe of the Maronites
 Ukrainian Catholic Eparchy of Saint Vladimir the Great of Paris (Ukrainian Catholic Byzantine Rite Eparchy in France), with cathedral see in Paris, directly subject to the Major Archbishop, for France, Belgium, Luxembourg, the Netherlands and Switzerland
 Ordinariate for Eastern Catholics in France, exempt, vested in the Metropolitan Archbishop of capital Paris, for Eastern Rites without proper ordinary

Ecclesiastical Province of Besançon (Franche-Comté and part of Lorraine)
Metropolitan Archdiocese of Besançon
Diocese of Belfort-Montbéliard
Diocese of Nancy
Diocese of Saint-Claude
Diocese of Saint-Dié
Diocese of Verdun

Ecclesiastical Province of Bordeaux (Aquitaine)
Metropolitan Archdiocese of Bordeaux
Diocese of Agen
Diocese of Aire and Dax
Diocese of Bayonne
Diocese of Périgueux

Ecclesiastical Province of Clermont (Auvergne)
Metropolitan Archdiocese of Clermont
Diocese of Le Puy-en-Velay
Diocese of Moulins
Diocese of Saint-Flour

Ecclesiastical Province of Dijon (Burgundy)
Metropolitan Archdiocese of Dijon
Archdiocese of Sens
Diocese of Autun
Diocese of Nevers
Territorial prelature of the Mission de France at Pontigny

Ecclesiastical Province of Lille (Nord-Pas-de-Calais)
Metropolitan Archdiocese of Lille
Archdiocese of Cambrai
Diocese of Arras

Ecclesiastical Province of Lyon (Rhône-Alpes)
Metropolitan Archdiocese of Lyon, primatial see
Archdiocese of Chambéry
Diocese of Annecy (includes territory in Switzerland)
Diocese of Belley-Ars
Diocese of Grenoble-Vienne
Diocese of Saint-Étienne
Diocese of Valence
Diocese of Viviers

Ecclesiastical Province of Marseille (Provence-Alpes-Côte-d'Azur and Corsica)
Metropolitan Archdiocese of Marseille
Archdiocese of Aix
Archdiocese of Avignon
Diocese of Ajaccio, on Corsica (both départements)
Diocese of Digne
Diocese of Fréjus-Toulon
Diocese of Gap
Diocese of Nice

Ecclesiastical Province of Montpellier (Languedoc-Roussillon)
Metropolitan Archdiocese of Montpellier
Diocese of Carcassonne and Narbonne
Diocese of Mende
Diocese of Nîmes
Diocese of Perpignan-Elne (Rousillon)

Ecclesiastical Province of Paris (capital region Ile-de-France)
Metropolitan Archdiocese of Paris
Diocese of Créteil
Diocese of Évry–Corbeil-Essonnes
Diocese of Meaux
Diocese of Nanterre
Diocese of Pontoise
Diocese of Saint-Denis
Diocese of Versailles

Ecclesiastical Province of Poitiers (Poitou-Charentes and Limousin)
Metropolitan Archdiocese of Poitiers
Diocese of Angoulême
Diocese of La Rochelle, also covers the French Overseas Collectivity of Saint Pierre and Miquelon
Diocese of Limoges
Diocese of Tulle

Ecclesiastical Province of Reims (Champagne-Ardenne and Picardy)
Metropolitan Archdiocese of Reims, primatial see
Diocese of Amiens
Diocese of Beauvais
Diocese of Châlons
Diocese of Langres
Diocese of Soissons
Diocese of Troyes

Ecclesiastical Province of Rennes (Brittany and Pays de la Loire)
Metropolitan Archdiocese of Rennes
Diocese of Angers
Diocese of Laval
Diocese of Le Mans
Diocese of Luçon
Diocese of Nantes
Diocese of Quimper
Diocese of Saint-Brieuc
Diocese of Vannes

Ecclesiastical Province of Rouen (Upper - and Lower Normandy)
Metropolitan Archdiocese of Rouen
Diocese of Bayeux
Diocese of Coutances
Diocese of Évreux
Diocese of Le Havre
Diocese of Séez

Eccleasiastical Province of Toulouse (Midi-Pyrénées)
Metropolitan Archdiocese of Toulouse
Archdiocese of Albi
Archdiocese of Auch
Diocese of Cahors
Diocese of Montauban
Diocese of Pamiers
Diocese of Rodez
Diocese of Tarbes-et-Lourdes

Eccleasiastical Province of Tours (Centre-Val de Loire region)
Metropolitan Archdiocese of Tours
Archdiocese of Bourges
Diocese of Blois
Diocese of Chartres
Diocese of Orléans

Episcopal Conference of Germany 

Exempt, immediately subject to the Holy See
 Military Ordinariate in Germany

Ecclesiastical province of Bamberg
Metropolitan Archdiocese of Bamberg
Diocese of Eichstätt
Diocese of Speyer
Diocese of Würzburg

Ecclesiastical province of Berlin
Metropolitan Archdiocese of Berlin
Diocese of Dresden-Meissen
Diocese of Görlitz

[Lower] Rhenish ecclesiastical province (aka Ecclesiastical province of Cologne)
Metropolitan Archdiocese of Cologne, formerly a prince-episcopal electorate
Diocese of Aachen (Aix-la-Chapelle)
Diocese of Essen
Diocese of Limburg
Diocese of Münster
Diocese of Trier, formerly a Metropolitan Archdiocese and prince-episcopal electorate

Upper Rhenish ecclesiastical province (aka Ecclesiastical province of Freiburg im Breisgau)
Metropolitan Archdiocese of Freiburg
Diocese of Mainz, formerly a Metropolitan archdiocese and prince-episcopal electorate
Diocese of Rottenburg-Stuttgart

Northern German ecclesiastical province (aka Ecclesiastical province of Hamburg)
Metropolitan Archdiocese of Hamburg
Diocese of Hildesheim
Diocese of Osnabrück

Ecclesiastical province of Munich and Freising, in Bavaria
Metropolitan Archdiocese of Munich and Freising
Diocese of Augsburg
Diocese of Passau
Diocese of Regensburg

Central German ecclesiastical province (aka Ecclesiastical province of Paderborn)
Metropolitan Archdiocese of Paderborn
Diocese of Erfurt
Diocese of Fulda
Diocese of Magdeburg

Episcopal Conference of Ireland, i.e. the Republic of Ireland and Northern Ireland 

Ecclesiastical province of Armagh — covers all of Northern Ireland (part of the UK) and part of the Republic of Ireland
Metropolitan Archdiocese of Armagh (partly in Northern Ireland) Primatial See "of All Ireland" 
Diocese of Ardagh and Clonmacnoise (wholly in Republic of Ireland)
Diocese of Clogher (partly in Northern Ireland)
Diocese of Derry (mainly Northern Ireland)
Diocese of Down and Connor (wholly in Northern Ireland)
Diocese of Dromore (wholly in Northern Ireland)
Diocese of Kilmore (mainly Republic of Ireland)
Diocese of Meath (wholly in Republic of Ireland)
Diocese of Raphoe (wholly in Republic of Ireland)

Ecclesiastical province of Cashel and Emly (Republic of Ireland)
Metropolitan Archdiocese of Cashel and Emly
Diocese of Cloyne
Diocese of Cork and Ross
Diocese of Kerry
Diocese of Killaloe
Diocese of Limerick
Diocese of Waterford and Lismore

Ecclesiastical province of Dublin (Republic of Ireland)
Metropolitan Archdiocese of Dublin, ranks below Armagh but Primatial See "of Ireland" 
Diocese of Ferns
Diocese of Kildare and Leighlin
Diocese of Ossory

Ecclesiastical province of Tuam (Republic of Ireland)
Metropolitan Archdiocese of Tuam
Diocese of Achonry
Diocese of Clonfert
Diocese of Elphin
Diocese of Galway and Kilmacduagh
Diocese of Killala

Episcopal Conference of Italy, including San Marino and Vatican City State 

Ecclesiastical Province of Rome
See: 
 Metropolitan Diocese of Rome (includes Vatican City State), whose suffragans are the seven suburbicarian sees, held by the six cardinal-bishops
Suburbicarian See of Ostia, held besides another suburbicaran see by the cardinal-dean
Suburbicarian See of Albano
Suburbicarian See of Frascati
Suburbicarian See of Palestrina
Suburbicarian See of Porto-Santa Rufina
Suburbicarian See of Sabina-Poggio Mirteto
Suburbicarian See of Velletri-Segni

other exempt Italian (arch)dioceses, immediately subject to the Holy See but not part of the province of Rome
Military Ordinariate of Italy
Archdiocese of Gaeta (never Metropolitan)
Archdiocese of Lucca (never Metropolitan)
Archdiocese of Spoleto-Norcia (never Metropolitan)
Diocese of Anagni-Alatri
Diocese of Civita Castellana
Diocese of Civitavecchia-Tarquinia
Diocese of Frosinone-Veroli-Ferentino
Diocese of Latina-Terracina-Sezze-Priverno
Diocese of Orvieto-Todi
Diocese of Rieti, united with the titular Territorial Abbacy of San Salvatore Maggiore
Diocese of Sora-Cassino-Aquino-Pontecorvo
Diocese of Terni-Narni-Amelia
Diocese of Tivoli
Diocese of Viterbo, united with the titular Territorial Abbacy of San Martino al Monte Cimino
Italo-Albanese Territorial Abbacy of Santa Maria di Grottaferrata, only non-Latin Church territorial abbey: Italo-Albanese Catholic rite
Italo-Albanese Diocese of Piana degli Albanesi, with cathedral see at Palermo, on Sicily
Italo-Albanese Diocese of Lungro, with cathedral see at Lungro, near Cosenza in Calabria
Ukrainian Catholic Apostolic Exarchate of Italy, with cathedral see at Rome
Territorial Abbey of Montecassino
Territorial Abbey of Monte Oliveto Maggiore
Territorial Abbey of Subiaco

Ecclesiastical Province of Venice
 Patriarchate of Venice, as Metropolitan Archdiocese
Diocese of Adria-Rovigo
Diocese of Belluno-Feltre
Diocese of Chioggia
Diocese of Concordia-Pordenone
Diocese of Padua
Diocese of Treviso
Diocese of Verona
Diocese of Vicenza
Diocese of Vittorio Veneto

Ecclesiastical Province of Agrigento, on Sicily
Metropolitan Archdiocese of Agrigento
Diocese of Caltanissetta
Diocese of Piazza Armerina

Ecclesiastical Province of Ancona-Osimo
Metropolitan Archdiocese of Ancona-Osimo
Diocese of Fabriano-Matelica
Diocese of Iesi
Diocese of Senigallia
Territorial Prelature of Loreto

Ecclesiastical Province of Bari-Bitonto
Metropolitan Archdiocese of Bari-Bitonto
Archdiocese of Trani-Barletta-Bisceglie (no longer Metropolitan)
Diocese of Altamura-Gravina-Acquaviva delle Fonti
Diocese of Andria
Diocese of Conversano-Monopoli
Diocese of Molfetta-Ruvo-Giovinazzo-Terlizzi

Ecclesiastical Province of Benevento
Metropolitan Archdiocese of Benevento
Archdiocese of Sant'Angelo dei Lombardi-Conza-Nusco-Bisaccia (never Metropolitan)
Diocese of Ariano Irpino-Lacedonia
Diocese of Avellino
Diocese of Cerreto Sannita-Telese-Sant’Agata de’ Goti
Territorial Abbey of Montevergine

Ecclesiastical Province of Bologna
Metropolitan Archdiocese of Bologna
Archdiocese of Ferrara-Comacchio (no longer Metropolitan; united with the now titular Territorial Abbacy of Pomposa)
Diocese of Faenza-Modigliana
Diocese of Imola

Ecclesiastical Province of Cagliari, on Sardinia
Metropolitan Archdiocese of Cagliari
Diocese of Iglesias
Diocese of Lanusei
Diocese of Nuoro

Ecclesiastical Province of Campobasso-Boiano
Metropolitan Archdiocese of Campobasso-Boiano
Diocese of Isernia-Venafro
Diocese of Termoli-Larino
Diocese of Trivento

Ecclesiastical Province of Catania, on Sicily
Metropolitan Archdiocese of Catania
Diocese of Acireale
Diocese of Caltagirone

Ecclesiastical Province of Catanzaro-Squillace
Metropolitan Archdiocese of Catanzaro-Squillace
Archdiocese of Crotone-Santa Severina (never Metropolitan)
Diocese of Lamezia Terme

Ecclesiastical Province of Chieti-Vasto
Metropolitan Archdiocese of Chieti-Vasto
Archdiocese of Lanciano-Ortona (no longer Metropolitan)

Ecclesiastical Province of Cosenza-Bisignano
Metropolitan Archdiocese of Cosenza-Bisignano
Archdiocese of Rossano-Cariati (never Metropolitan)
Diocese of Cassano all'Jonio
Diocese of San Marco Argentano-Scalea

Ecclesiastical Province of Fermo
Metropolitan Archdiocese of Fermo
Archdiocese of Camerino-San Severino Marche (never Metropolitan)
Diocese of Ascoli Piceno
Diocese of Macerata-Tolentino-Recanati-Cingoli-Treia
Diocese of San Benedetto del Tronto-Ripatransone-Montalto

Ecclesiastical Province of Florence
Metropolitan Archdiocese of Florence
Diocese of Arezzo-Cortona-Sansepolcro
Diocese of Fiesole
Diocese of Pistoia
Diocese of Prato
Diocese of San Miniato

Ecclesiastical Province of Foggia-Bovino
Metropolitan Archdiocese of Foggia-Bovino
Archdiocese of Manfredonia-Vieste-S. Giovanni Rotondo (no longer Metropolitan)
Diocese of Cerignola-Ascoli Satriano
Diocese of Lucera-Troia
Diocese of San Severo

Ecclesiastical Province of Genoa
Metropolitan Archdiocese of Genoa
Diocese of Albenga-Imperia
Diocese of Chiavari
Diocese of La Spezia-Sarzana-Brugnato
Diocese of Savona-Noli
Diocese of Tortona
Diocese of Ventimiglia-San Remo

Ecclesiastical Province of Gorizia
 Metropolitan Archdiocese of Gorizia
 Diocese of Trieste

Ecclesiastical Province of L'Aquila
 Metropolitan Archdiocese of L'Aquila
 Diocese of Avezzano
 Diocese of Sulmona-Valva

Ecclesiastical Province of Lecce
Metropolitan Archdiocese of Lecce
Archdiocese of Brindisi-Ostuni (no longer Metropolitan)
Archdiocese of Otranto (no longer Metropolitan)
Diocese of Nardò-Gallipoli
Diocese of Ugento-Santa Maria di Leuca

Ecclesiastical Province of Messina-Lipari-Santa Lucia del Mela, on Sicily
Metropolitan Archdiocese of Messina-Lipari-Santa Lucia del Mela, united with the titular Territorial Abbacy of Santissimo Salvatore
Diocese of Nicosia
Diocese of Patti

Ecclesiastical Province of Milan
Metropolitan Archdiocese of Milan - This archdiocese also uses the now strictly local, Latin Ambrosian rite (Italian language) rite besides the general Roman Rite
Diocese of Bergamo
Diocese of Brescia
Diocese of Como
Diocese of Crema
Diocese of Cremona
Diocese of Lodi
Diocese of Mantua
Diocese of Pavia
Diocese of Vigevano

Ecclesiastical Province of Modena-Nonantola
Metropolitan Archdiocese of Modena-Nonantola
Diocese of Carpi
Diocese of Fidenza
Diocese of Parma, united with the titular Territorial Abbacy of Fontevivo
Diocese of Piacenza-Bobbio, united with the titular Territorial Abbacy of San Colombano
Diocese of Reggio Emilia-Guastalla

Ecclesiastical Province of Naples
Metropolitan Archdiocese of Naples
Archdiocese of Capua (no longer Metropolitan)
Archdiocese of Sorrento-Castellammare di Stabia (no longer Metropolitan)
Diocese of Acerra
Diocese of Alife-Caiazzo
Diocese of Aversa
Diocese of Caserta
Diocese of Ischia
Diocese of Nola
Diocese of Pozzuoli
Diocese of Sessa Aurunca
Diocese of Teano-Calvi
Territorial Prelature of Pompei o Beatissima Vergine Maria del SS.mo Rosario (Pompei aka Blessed Virgin of the Most Sacred Rosary)

Ecclesiastical Province of Oristano
Metropolitan Archdiocese of Oristano
Diocese of Ales-Terralba

Ecclesiastical Province of Palermo, on Sicily
Metropolitan Archdiocese of Palermo
Archdiocese of Monreale (no longer Metropolitan; originally a territorial abbacy)
Diocese of Cefalu
Diocese of Mazara del Vallo
Diocese of Trapani

Ecclesiastical Province of Perugia-Città della Pieve
Metropolitan Archdiocese of Perugia-Città della Pieve
Diocese of Assisi-Nocera Umbra-Gualdo Tadino
Diocese of Città di Castello
Diocese of Foligno
Diocese of Gubbio

Ecclesiastical Province of Pesaro
Metropolitan Archdiocese of Pesaro
Archdiocese of Urbino-Urbania-Sant'Angelo in Vado (no longer Metropolitan)
Diocese of Fano-Fossombrone-Cagli-Pergola

Ecclesiastical Province of Pescara-Penne
Metropolitan Archdiocese of Pescara-Penne
Diocese of Teramo-Atri

Ecclesiastical Province of Pisa
Metropolitan Archdiocese of Pisa
Diocese of Livorno
Diocese of Massa Carrara-Pontremoli
Diocese of Pescia
Diocese of Volterra

Ecclesiastical Province of Potenza-Muro Lucano-Marsico Nuovo
Metropolitan Archdiocese of Potenza-Muro Lucano-Marsico Nuovo
Archdiocese of Acerenza (no longer Metropolitan)
Archdiocese of Matera-Irsina (no longer Metropolitan), united with the titular Territorial Abbacy of San Michele Arcangelo di Montescaglioso
Diocese of Melfi-Rapolla-Venosa
Diocese of Tricarico
Diocese of Tursi-Lagonegro

Ecclesiastical Province of Ravenna-Cervia
Metropolitan Archdiocese of Ravenna-Cervia
Diocese of Cesena-Sarsina
Diocese of Forli-Bertinoro
Diocese of Rimini
Diocese of San Marino-Montefeltro (includes the independent republic of San Marino but has its see in Pennabilli, in Italy's Pesaro e Urbino province

Ecclesiastical Province of Reggio Calabria-Bova
Metropolitan Archdiocese of Reggio Calabria-Bova
Diocese of Locri-Gerace, united with the titular Territorial Abbacy of Santa Maria di Polsi
Diocese of Mileto-Nicotera-Tropea
Diocese of Oppido Mamertina-Palmi

Ecclesiastical Province of Salerno-Campagna-Acerno
Metropolitan Archdiocese of Salerno-Campagna-Acerno
Archdiocese of Amalfi-Cava de' Tirreni (no longer Metropolitan)
Diocese of Nocera Inferiore-Sarno
Diocese of Teggiano-Policastro
Diocese of Vallo della Lucania
Territorial Abbey of Santissima Trinità di Cava de' Tirreni

Ecclesiastical Province of Sassari, on Sardinia
Metropolitan Archdiocese of Sassari
Diocese of Alghero-Bosa
Diocese of Ozieri
Diocese of Tempio-Ampurias

Ecclesiastical Province of Siena-Colle di Val d'Elsa-Montalcino
Metropolitan Archdiocese of Siena-Colle di Val d'Elsa-Montalcino
Diocese of Grosseto
Diocese of Massa Marittima-Piombino
Diocese of Montepulciano-Chiusi-Pienza
Diocese of Pitigliano-Sovana-Orbetello

Ecclesiastical Province of Siracusa, on Sicily
Metropolitan Archdiocese of Siracusa
Diocese of Noto
Diocese of Ragusa

Ecclesiastical Province of Taranto
Metropolitan Archdiocese of Taranto
Diocese of Castellaneta
Diocese of Oria

Ecclesiastical Province of Turin
Metropolitan Archdiocese of Turin
Diocese of Acqui
Diocese of Alba Pompeia
Diocese of Aosta
Diocese of Asti
Diocese of Cuneo
Diocese of Fossano
Diocese of Ivrea
Diocese of Mondovi
Diocese of Pinerolo
Diocese of Saluzzo
Diocese of Susa

Ecclesiastical Province of Trento
Metropolitan Archdiocese of Trento
Diocese of Bolzano-Brixen

Ecclesiastical Province of Udine
 Archdiocese of Udine (nominal Metropolitan, no suffragan)

Ecclesiastical Province of Vercelli
Metropolitan Archdiocese of Vercelli
Diocese of Alessandria della Paglia
Diocese of Biella
Diocese of Casale Monferrato
Diocese of Novara

Episcopal Conference of Malta 

Ecclesiastical Province of Malta
 Metropolitan Archdiocese of Malta
 Diocese of Gozo

Episcopal Conference of the Netherlands 

Exempt, i.e. directly subject to the Holy See
 Military Ordinariate of the Netherlands
 For the Ukrainian Catholics, see France

Ecclesiastical Province of Utrecht, covering the Netherlands proper
Metropolitan Archdiocese of Utrecht
Diocese of Breda
Diocese of Groningen-Leeuwarden
Diocese of Haarlem-Amsterdam
Diocese of Roermond
Diocese of Rotterdam
Diocese of 's-Hertogenbosch

Episcopal Conference of Portugal, incl. Azores and Madeira 

Exempt, i.e. directly subject to the Holy See
 Military Ordinariate of Portugal (the 'Army Bishopric')

Ecclesiastical Province of Lisboa (Lisbon)
 Patriarchate of Lisboa, the province's Metropolitan Archdiocese at Lisbon
Diocese of Guarda
Diocese of Leiria-Fátima
Diocese of Portalegre-Castelo Branco
Diocese of Santarém
Diocese of Setúbal
Diocese of Angra, on the Azores
Diocese of Funchal, on and also known as Diocese of Madeira

Ecclesiastical Province of Braga
Metropolitan Archdiocese of Braga, primatial see of “the Spains” 
Diocese of Aveiro
Diocese of Bragança-Miranda
Diocese of Coimbra
Diocese of Lamego
Diocese of Porto
Diocese of Viana do Castelo
Diocese of Vila Real
Diocese of Viseu

Ecclesiastical Province of Évora
 Metropolitan Archdiocese of Évora
 Diocese of Beja
 Diocese of Faro, also known as Diocese of the Algarve

Episcopal Conference of Scandinavia 

Scandinavian Bishops Conference
 All exempt, each directly subject to the Holy See, no provincial or national conferences
 Diocese of Stockholm, for all of Sweden
 Diocese of Copenhagen, for all of Denmark and its overseas territories Greenland and the Faroe Islands
 Diocese of Oslo, for most of Norway plus its Arctic territories Svalbard and Jan Mayen and uninhabited Bouvet Island
 Territorial Prelature of Trondheim in Norway
 Territorial Prelature of Tromsø in Norway
(and two more Nordic countries, not geographically part of Scandinavia proper, also both exempt)
 Diocese of Helsinki, for all of Finland and the autonomous region of Åland
 Diocese of Reykjavík, for all of Iceland

Episcopal Conference of Scotland (part of UK) 

the Military Ordinariate for Great-Britain for UK-based troops, being joint with England & Wales, is exempt, i.e. directly subject to the Holy See

Ecclesiastical province of Glasgow
 Metropolitan Archdiocese of Glasgow
 Diocese of Motherwell
 Diocese of Paisley

Ecclesiastical province of St Andrews and Edinburgh
 Metropolitan Archdiocese of St Andrews and Edinburgh
 Diocese of Aberdeen
 Diocese of Argyll and the Isles
 Diocese of Dunkeld
 Diocese of Galloway

Episcopal Conference of Spain (incl. African territories) and Andorra 

 Titular Patriarchate of the West Indies, indefinitely vacant
Exempt, i.e. directly subject to the Holy See
 Military Ordinariate of Spain (the 'Army Bishopric')
 Ordinariate for the Faithful of Eastern Rite in Spain

Ecclesiastical province of Barcelona

 Metropolitan Archdiocese of Barcelona
 Diocese of Sant Feliu de Llobregat
 Diocese of Terrassa

Ecclesiastical province of Burgos
 Metropolitan Archdiocese of Burgos
 Diocese of Bilbao
 Diocese of Osma-Soria
 Diocese of Palencia
 Diocese of Vitoria

Ecclesiastical province of Granada
 Metropolitan Archdiocese of Granada
 Diocese of Almería
 Diocese of Cartagena
 Diocese of Guadix
 Diocese of Jaén
 Diocese of Málaga, including the North African territory Melilla, a Spanish enclave in Morocco

Ecclesiastical province of Madrid
 Metropolitan Archdiocese of Madrid
 Diocese of Alcalá de Henares
 Diocese of Getafe

Ecclesiastical province of Mérida-Badajoz
 Metropolitan Archdiocese of Mérida-Badajoz
 Diocese of Coria-Cáceres
 Diocese of Plasencia

Ecclesiastical province of Oviedo
 Metropolitan Archdiocese of Oviedo
 Diocese of Astorga
 Diocese of León
 Diocese of Santander

Ecclesiastical province of Pamplona
 Metropolitan Archdiocese of Pamplona y Tudela
 Diocese of Calahorra and La Calzada-Logroño
 Diocese of Jaca
 Diocese of San Sebastián

Ecclesiastical province of Santiago de Compostela
 Metropolitan Archdiocese of Santiago de Compostela
 Diocese of Lugo
 Diocese of Mondoñedo-Ferrol
 Diocese of Ourense
 Diocese of Tui-Vigo

Ecclesiastical province of Seville, mainly comprising Andalusia
 Metropolitan Archdiocese of Seville
Diocese of Cádiz and Ceuta, including the North African territory Ceuta, a Spanish enclave in Morocco
Diocese of the Canaries (at Las Palmas, on Gran Canaria), geographically African
 Diocese of Córdoba
 Diocese of Huelva
 Diocese of Jerez de la Frontera
 Diocese of San Cristóbal de La Laguna (on Tenerife), geographically African

Ecclesiastical province of Tarragona
 Metropolitan Archdiocese of Tarragona
 Diocese of Girona
 Diocese of Lleida
 Diocese of Solsona
 Diocese of Tortosa
 Diocese of (Seo de) Urgell, including Andorra, where the bishop still shares the joint sovereign status of 'co-prince' with the French head of state, making him the last true prince-bishop besides the pope
 Diocese of Vic

Ecclesiastical province of Toledo
 Metropolitan Archdiocese of Toledo, primatial see of Spain - This archdiocese is the only one using a now strictly local Latin liturgical rite besides the general Roman Rite - Mozarabic rite (Latin language)
 Diocese of Albacete
 Diocese of Ciudad Real
 Diocese of Cuenca
 Diocese of Sigüenza-Guadalajara

Ecclesiastical province of Valencia, including the Balearic Isles
 Metropolitan Archdiocese of Valencia
 Diocese of Ibiza
 Diocese of Mallorca
 Diocese of Menorca
 Diocese of Orihuela-Alicante
 Diocese of Segorbe-Castellón

Ecclesiastical province of Valladolid
 Metropolitan Archdiocese of Valladolid
 Diocese of Ávila
 Diocese of Ciudad Rodrigo
 Diocese of Salamanca
 Diocese of Segovia
 Diocese of Zamora

Ecclesiastical province of Zaragoza
 Metropolitan Archdiocese of Zaragoza
 Diocese of Barbastro-Monzón
 Diocese of Huesca
 Diocese of Tarazona
 Diocese of Teruel and Albarracín

Episcopal Conference of Switzerland 

Swiss Bishops Conference
only exempt dioceses, each immediately subject to the Holy See
 Diocese of Basel
 Diocese of Chur
 Diocese of Lausanne, Geneva and Fribourg
 Diocese of Lugano
 Diocese of Sankt Gallen
 Diocese of Sion (Sitten)
 Territorial Abbacy of Maria Einsiedeln
 Territorial Abbacy of Saint-Maurice d’Agaune
  part of the French diocese of Annecy (in the ecclesiastical province of Lyon) is also on Swiss territory

Episcopal Conference of Albania 

Ecclesiastical Province of Shkodër-Pult (Latin Church)
 Metropolitan Archdiocese of Shkodër-Pult (Scutari-Pulati)
 Diocese of Lezhë (formerly Alessio)
 Diocese of Sapë

Ecclesiastical Province of Tiranë-Durrës (mixed Churches)
 Metropolitan Archdiocese of Tiranë-Durrës
 Diocese of Rrëshen
 Apostolic Administration of Southern Albania, the Byzantine Rite Albanese Catholic Church's only proper diocese

Episcopal Conference of Saints Cyril and Methodius - for Macedonia, Montenegro and Serbia 

The Republic of Macedonia has
 the Latin Diocese of Skopje, a suffragan in the province of the Bosnian Metropolitan Archdiocese of Vrhbosna
 the Eastern Catholic (Byzantine Rite) Macedonian Catholic Church, comprising only the exempt Macedonian Catholic Eparchy of the Assumption of the Blessed Virgin Mary in Strumica-Skopje, vested in the above Latin Church bishop of Skopje

Montenegro has no national level, but two Latin dioceses
 the exempt senior see: Archdiocese of Bar, directly subject to the Holy See
 Diocese of Kotor, suffragan in the ecclesiastical province of the Croatian Metropolitan Archdiocese of Split–Makarska

Ecclesiastical Province of Beograd (Belgrado), Latin, covering Serbia
 Metropolitan Archdiocese of Belgrade
 Diocese of Subotica
 Diocese of Srijem, suffragan in the ecclesiastical province of the Croatian Metropolitan Archdiocese of Đakovo-Osijek
 Diocese of Zrenjanin
Byzantine Catholic Eparchy of Saint Nicholas of Ruski Krstur, for Catholics of Byzantine Rite in Serbia

Episcopal Conference of Belarus 

The Belarusian Catholic Church (Byzantine Rite) has no proper diocese presently, only an apostolic visitor for Belarus and another for abroad, neither vested in any see

(Latin) Ecclesiastical Province of Miensk-Mahiloǔ
 Metropolitan Archdiocese of Minsk-Mohilev
 Diocese of Grodno
 Diocese of Pinsk
 Diocese of Vitebsk

Episcopal Conference of Bosnia and Herzegovina 

Exempt, i.e. directly subject to the Holy See
 Military Ordinariate of Bosnia and Herzegovina, not vested in any see

Ecclesiastical Province of Sarajevo, covering all Bosnia and Herzegovina and ...
 Metropolitan Archdiocese of Vrhbosna
 Diocese of Banja Luka
 Diocese of Mostar-Duvno
 Diocese of Trebinje-Mrkan
 the province also comprises the Diocese of Skopje, which covers the Republic of Macedonia and belongs to the episcopal conference of Saints Cyril and Method (Macedonia, Montenegro and Serbia)

Croatian Catholic Eparchy of Križevci, the Croatian proper diocese of the Byzantine rite Eastern Croatian Catholic Church, suffragan of the Metropolitan of Zagreb, also covers Catholics of Byzantine Rite in all of Slovenia and Bosnia and Herzegovina

Episcopal Conference of Bulgaria 

 Bulgaria has no ecclesiastical province, only exempt Ordinariates, immediately subject to the Holy See, of two Churches
 Latin Church:
 Diocese of Nicopoli
 Diocese of Sofia and Plovdiv
 Bulgarian Catholic Apostolic Exarchate of Sofia, the only proper ordinariate of the Byzantine Rite particular Bulgarian Byzantine Catholic Church

Episcopal Conference of Croatia 

Exempt, immediately subject to the Holy See
 Military Ordinariate of Croatia, not vested in any see
 Archdiocese of Zadar (lost Metropolitan status)

Ecclesiastical Province of Đakovo-Osijek, also known as Simium (Sirmio)
 Metropolitan Archdiocese of Đakovo-Osijek
 Diocese of Požega
 the province also comprises the Diocese of Srijem, which is in Serbia and hence belongs to the episcopal conference of Saints Cyril and Method (Macedonia, Montenegro and Serbia)

Ecclesiastical Province of Rijeka
 Metropolitan Archdiocese of Rijeka
 Diocese of Gospić–Senj
 Diocese of Krk
 Diocese of Poreč-Pula

Ecclesiastical Province of Split-Makarska
 Metropolitan Archdiocese of Split-Makarska
 Diocese of Dubrovnik
 Diocese of Hvar-Brac-Vis
 Diocese of Šibenik
 the province also comprises the Diocese of Kotor, which is in and covers Montenegro and hence belongs to the episcopal conference of Saints Cyril and Method (Macedonia, Montenegro and Serbia)

Ecclesiastical Province of Zagreb (Latin and Eastern Churches)
 Metropolitan Archdiocese of Zagreb (Roman Catholic)
 Roman Catholic Diocese of Bjelovar-Križevci
 Roman Catholic Diocese of Sisak
 Roman Catholic Diocese of Varaždin
 Croatian Catholic Eparchy of Križevci, the only proper diocese of the Byzantine rite Eastern Croatian Catholic Church, covering all of Croatia, Slovenia and Bosnia and Herzegovina

Episcopal Conference of the Czech Republic 

Exempt, i.e. immediately subject to the Holy See
 Ruthenian Apostolic Exarchate of Czech Republic (Byzantine rite)

Ecclesiastical Province of Bohemia or Prague (after its Metropolitan see)
 Metropolitan Archdiocese of Prague
 Diocese of České Budějovice
 Diocese of Hradec Králové
 Diocese of Litoměřice
 Diocese of Plzeň

Ecclesiastical Province of Moravia or Olomouc (after its Metropolitan see)
 Metropolitan Archdiocese of Olomouc
 Diocese of Brno
 Diocese of Ostrava-Opava

Episcopal Conference of Greece 

 Exempt Latin (arch)dioceses, immediately depending from the Holy See
 Archdiocese of Athens
 Archdiocese of Rhodos
 Apostolic Vicariate of Thessaloniki

Exempt Eastern Catholic
Armenian Catholic Ordinariate of Greece
Greek Catholic Apostolic Exarchate of Greece, with cathedral see in Athens, for the Greek Catholic particular Eastern church

Ecclesiastical Province of Corfu, Zakynthos and Cephalonia (for Ionian islands)
 Archdiocese of Corfu, Zakynthos, and Cephalonia (nominal Metropolitan, no suffragan)

Ecclesiastical Province of Naxos, Andros, Tinos and Mykonos (for various Aegean islands)
Metropolitan Archdiocese of Naxos, Andros, Tinos and Mykonos
Diocese of Chios
Diocese of Crete
Diocese of Santorini
Diocese of Syros and Milos

Episcopal Conference of Hungary (Latin and Eastern Churches) 

 Exempt, i.e. immediately subject to the Holy See
 Military Ordinariate of Hungary, not vested in any see
 Territorial Abbacy of Pannonhalma, whose cathedral see is a minor basilica

Ecclesiastical Province of Eger
Metropolitan Archdiocese of Eger
Diocese of Debrecen–Nyíregyháza
Diocese of Vác

Ecclesiastical Province of Esztergom-Budapest
Metropolitan Archdiocese of Esztergom-Budapest
Diocese of Győr
Diocese of Székesfehérvár

Ecclesiastical Province of Kalocsa-Kecskemét
Metropolitan Archdiocese of Kalocsa-Kecskemét
Diocese of Pécs
Diocese of Szeged–Csanád

Ecclesiastical Province of Veszprém
Metropolitan Archdiocese of Veszprém
Diocese of Kaposvár
Diocese of Szombathely

Hungarian Catholic church Metropolitanate sui iuris 
Metropolitan Archeparchy of Hajdúdorog
Eparchy of Miskolc
Eparchy of Nyíregyháza

Episcopal Conference of Latvia 

Ecclesiastical Province of Riga, covering Latvia
 Metropolitan Archdiocese of Riga
 Diocese of Jelgava
 Diocese of Liepāja
 Diocese of Rēzekne–Aglona

Episcopal Conference of Lithuania 

 Exempt, i.e. immediately subject to the Holy See
 Military Ordinariate of Lithuania, not vested in any see

Ecclesiastical Province of Vilnius
 Metropolitan Archdiocese of Vilnius
 Diocese of Kaišiadorys
 Diocese of Panevėžys

Ecclesiastical Province of Kaunas
 Metropolitan Archdiocese of Kaunas
 Diocese of Šiauliai
 Diocese of Telšiai
 Diocese of Vilkaviškis

Episcopal Conference of Poland 

Exempt, i.e. directly subject to the Holy See
 Military Ordinariate of Poland
 Ordinariate for Eastern Catholics in Poland

Ecclesiastical province of Białystok
Archdiocese of Białystok
Diocese of Drohiczyn
Diocese of Łomża

Ecclesiastical province of Częstochowa
Archdiocese of Częstochowa
Diocese of Radom
Diocese of Sosnowiec

Ecclesiastical province of Gdańsk
Archdiocese of Gdańsk
Diocese of Pelplin
Diocese of Toruń

Ecclesiastical province of Gniezno
Archdiocese of Gniezno
Diocese of Bydgoszcz
Diocese of Włocławek

Ecclesiastical province of Katowice
Archdiocese of Katowice
Diocese of Gliwice
Diocese of Opole

Ecclesiastical province of Kraków
Archdiocese of Kraków
Diocese of Bielsko-Żywiec
Diocese of Kielce
Diocese of Tarnów

Ecclesiastical province of Łódź
Archdiocese of Łódź
Diocese of Łowicz

Ecclesiastical province of Lublin
Archdiocese of Lublin
Diocese of Sandomierz
Diocese of Siedlce

Ecclesiastical province of Poznań
Archdiocese of Poznań
Diocese of Kalisz

Ecclesiastical province of Przemyśl
Archdiocese of Przemyśl
Diocese of Rzeszów
Diocese of Zamość-Lubaczów

Ecclesiastical province of Szczecin-Kamień
Archdiocese of Szczecin-Kamień
Diocese of Koszalin-Kołobrzeg
Diocese of Zielona Góra-Gorzów

Ecclesiastical province of Warmia
Archdiocese of Warmia
Diocese of Elbląg
Diocese of Ełk

Ecclesiastical province of Warszawa
Archdiocese of Warszawa
Diocese of Płock
Diocese of Warszawa-Praga

Ecclesiastical province of Wrocław
Archdiocese of Wrocław
Diocese of Legnica
Diocese of Świdnica

Ukrainian Greek Catholic province of Przemyśl–Warszawa 
 Metropolitan Ukrainian Catholic Archeparchy of Przemyśl–Warsaw 
 Ukrainian Catholic Eparchy of Olsztyn–Gdańsk
 Ukrainian Catholic Eparchy of Wrocław-Koszalin

Episcopal Conference of Romania 

Exempt (immediately subject to Rome, no ecclesiastical province)
 Latin: Archdiocese of Alba Iulia/Gyulafehérvár
 Eastern Catholic: Armenian Catholic Ordinariate of Romania

Ecclesiastical Province of Bucharest (Latin)
 Metropolitan Archdiocese of Bucharest
 Diocese of Iaşi
 Diocese of Oradea Mare/Nagyvárad
 Diocese of Satu Mare/Szatmár
 Diocese of Timişoara/Temesvár

Eastern Catholic (Byzantine Rite) Major Archiepiscopal Romanian (Greek) Catholic Church's ecclesiastical (sole) province sui juris, covering Romania
 Romanian Greek Catholic Major Archeparchy of Făgăraș and Alba Iulia, the Major Archbishopric, with cathedral see at Blaj, Alba Julia
Romanian Catholic Eparchy of Oradea Mare
Romanian Catholic Eparchy of Cluj-Gherla
Romanian Catholic Eparchy of Lugos
Romanian Catholic Eparchy of Maramureș
Romanian Catholic Eparchy of Saint Basil the Great of Bucharest

Episcopal Conference of the Russian Federation 

Exempt, i.e. directly subject to the Holy See
 Russian Catholic Apostolic Exarchate of Russia

Ecclesiastical Province of Moscow (partly in Asia- eastern Siberia)
 Archdiocese of Mother of God at Moscow, in Moscow
 Diocese of Saint Clement at Saratov, at Saratov
 Diocese of Transfiguration at Novosibirsk, in Novosibirsk (in western Siberia)
 and an Asian diocese: Diocese of Saint Joseph at Irkutsk, at Irkutsk (in eastern Siberian Far East)

 also includes, in Asia, one exempt diocese, immediately subject to the Holy See:
 Apostolic Prefecture of Yuzhno Sakhalinsk, on Sakhalin island off eastern Siberia

Episcopal Conference of Slovakia 

Exempt, i.e. immediately subject to the Holy See
 Military Ordinariate of Slovakia, not vested in any see

Ecclesiastical Province of Bratislava (Latin)
 Metropolitan Archdiocese of Bratislava
 Archdiocese of Trnava (not Metropolitan)
 Diocese of Banská Bystrica
 Diocese of Nitra
 Diocese of Žilina

Ecclesiastical Province of Košice (Latin)
 Metropolitan Archdiocese of Košice
 Diocese of Rožňava
 Diocese of Spiš

Slovak Catholic Metropolitanate sui juris of Prešov (Eastern Catholic, Byzantine rite)
 Slovak Catholic Archeparchy of Prešov, the Metropolitan head of the particular church and its sole province's Metropolitan Archeparch (Archbishop), with suffragan Eparchies (bishoprics)
Slovak Catholic Eparchy of Bratislava
Slovak Catholic Eparchy of Košice

Episcopal Conference of Slovenia 

Ecclesiastical Province of Ljubljana
 Metropolitan Archdiocese of Ljubljana
 Diocese of Koper
 Diocese of Novo Mesto

Ecclesiastical Province of Maribor
 Metropolitan Archdiocese of Maribor
 Diocese of Celje
 Diocese of Murska Sobota

Croatian Catholic Eparchy of Križevci, the Croatian proper diocese of the Byzantine rite Eastern Croatian Catholic Church, suffragan of the Metropolitan of Zagreb, also covers Catholics of Byzantine Rite in all of Slovenia and Bosnia and Herzegovina

Episcopal Conference of Ukraine 

Roman Catholic Ecclesiastical province of Lviv, covering the Latin church in all Ukraine, including the Russian-annexed Crimea (Krym)
 Metropolitan Archdiocese of Lviv
Diocese of Kyiv-Zhytomyr
Diocese of Kamyanets-Podilskyi
Diocese of Lutsk
Diocese of Mukacheve
Diocese of Kharkiv-Zaporizhzhia
Diocese of Odessa-Simferopol

Armenian Catholic (Armenian rite)
 Armenian Catholic Archeparchy of Lviv, directly dependent on the Armenian Catholic Patriarchate of Cilicia

Ruthenian Catholic (Byzantine rite)
 Ruthenian Catholic Eparchy of Mukacheve, directly dependent to the Holy See. Is regarded as the maternal circumscription of the Ruthenian Catholic Church

Ukrainian Catholic (Byzantine rite) Metropolitanates
 Ukrainian Catholic Major Archeparchy of Kyiv–Halych, the Major Archeparchy and head of the particular church
Ukrainian Catholic Archeparchy of Kyiv, the proper Metropolitan Archeparchy, at Kiev (Kyiv)
Ukrainian Catholic Archiepiscopal Exarchate of Crimea (Krym), on the Russian-annexed Crimea, with cathedral see at Simferopol
Ukrainian Catholic Archiepiscopal Exarchate of Donetsk
Ukrainian Catholic Archiepiscopal Exarchate of Kharkiv
Ukrainian Catholic Archiepiscopal Exarchate of Lutsk
Ukrainian Catholic Archiepiscopal Exarchate of Odessa
 Ukrainian Catholic Archeparchy of Lviv (Metropolitan Archeparchy)
Ukrainian Catholic Eparchy of Stryi
Ukrainian Catholic Eparchy of Sambir – Drohobych
Ukrainian Catholic Eparchy of Sokal – Zhovkva
 Ukrainian Catholic Archeparchy of Ternopil – Zboriv (Metropolitan Archeparchy)
Ukrainian Catholic Eparchy of Buchach
Ukrainian Catholic Eparchy of Kamyanets-Podilskyi
 Ukrainian Catholic Archeparchy of Ivano-Frankivsk (Metropolitan Archeparchy)
Ukrainian Catholic Eparchy of Chernivtsi
Ukrainian Catholic Eparchy of Kolomyia

North America (Latin and Eastern Churches)

Episcopal Conference of Canada 

Exempt, i.e. immediately subject to the Holy See
 Military Ordinariate of Canada
 Archdiocese of Winnipeg

Ecclesiastical province of Edmonton, comprising  most of the province of Alberta.
Metropolitan Archdiocese of Edmonton
Diocese of Calgary
Diocese of Saint Paul, Alberta

Ecclesiastical province of Gatineau, comprising the western and northern parts of the province of Quebec.
Metropolitan Archdiocese of Gatineau
Diocese of Amos
Diocese of Mont-Laurier
Diocese of Rouyn-Noranda

Ecclesiastical province of Grouard–McLennan, comprising the northernmost parts of the provinces of Alberta and British Columbia, as well as the Yukon and Northwest Territories.
Metropolitan Archdiocese of Grouard-McLennan
Diocese of Mackenzie-Fort Smith
Diocese of Whitehorse

Ecclesiastical province of Halifax, comprising the provinces of Nova Scotia and Prince Edward Island.
Metropolitan Archdiocese of Halifax-Yarmouth
Diocese of Antigonish
Diocese of Charlottetown

Ecclesiastical province of Keewatin-Le Pas, comprising the northern parts of the provinces of Saskatchewan, Manitoba, and Ontario, and the territory of Nunavut.
Metropolitan Archdiocese of Keewatin–Le Pas
Diocese of Churchill-Hudson Bay

Ecclesiastical province of Kingston, comprising the central portions of the Canadian province of Ontario.
Metropolitan Archdiocese of Kingston
Diocese of Peterborough
Diocese of Sault Sainte Marie

Ecclesiastical province of Moncton, comprising the province of New Brunswick.
Metropolitan Archdiocese of Moncton
Diocese of Bathurst (in Canada)
Diocese of Edmundston
Diocese of Saint John, New Brunswick

Ecclesiastical province of Montréal, in Quebec, comprising the island of Montreal and surrounding areas to the north and south.
Metropolitan Archdiocese of Montréal
Diocese of Joliette
Diocese of Saint-Jean-Longueuil
Diocese of Saint-Jérôme
Diocese of Valleyfield

Ecclesiastical province of Ottawa, comprising the northeastern part of the province of Ontario and a small portion of Quebec.
Metropolitan Archdiocese of Ottawa–Cornwall
Diocese of Hearst–Moosonee
Diocese of Pembroke
Diocese of Timmins

Ecclesiastical province of Québec, comprising only the central part of the province of Quebec, centering on the civil provincial capital Quebec City.
Metropolitan Archdiocese of Québec (Quebec City)
Diocese of Chicoutimi
Diocese of Sainte-Anne-de-la-Pocatière
Diocese of Trois-Rivières

Ecclesiastical province of Regina, comprising the southern part of the province of Saskatchewan.
Metropolitan Archdiocese of Regina
Diocese of Prince Albert
Diocese of Saskatoon

Ecclesiastical province of Rimouski, comprising the Gaspé Peninsula and the areas across the St. Lawrence River to the north, in the province of Quebec.
Metropolitan Archdiocese of Rimouski
Diocese of Baie-Comeau
Diocese of Gaspé

Ecclesiastical province of Saint Boniface, comprising the southwest part of the province of Manitoba.
Archdiocese of Saint Boniface (no suffragan)

Ecclesiastical province of St. John's, Newfoundland, comprising the province of Newfoundland and Labrador.
Metropolitan Archdiocese of St. John's, Newfoundland
Diocese of Grand Falls
Diocese of Corner Brook and Labrador

Ecclesiastical province of Sherbrooke, comprising the part of the province of Quebec to the southeast of Montreal.
Metropolitan Archdiocese of Sherbrooke
Diocese of Nicolet
Diocese of Saint-Hyacinthe

Ecclesiastical province of Toronto, comprising the southwest part of the province of Ontario, with the non-contiguous Diocese of Thunder Bay in western Ontario.
Metropolitan Archdiocese of Toronto
Diocese of Hamilton, Ontario
Diocese of London, Ontario
Diocese of Saint Catharines
Diocese of Thunder Bay

Ecclesiastical province of Vancouver, comprising most of the province of British Columbia.
Metropolitan Archdiocese of Vancouver
Diocese of Kamloops
Diocese of Nelson
Diocese of Prince George
Diocese of Victoria

Ukrainian Catholic province of Winnipeg
Ukrainian Catholic Archeparchy of Winnipeg, Metropolitan Archdiocese of a Byzantine rite province in Canada
Ukrainian Catholic Eparchy of Edmonton
Ukrainian Catholic Eparchy of Toronto and Eastern Canada
Ukrainian Catholic Eparchy of Saskatoon
Ukrainian Catholic Eparchy of New Westminster

Other Eastern church dioceses in Canada, immediately subject to their particular churches
 Chaldean Catholic Eparchy of Mar Addai of Toronto, subject to the Patriarch of Babylon
 Maronite Diocese of Saint-Maron of Montréal, subject to the Maronite Catholic Patriarch of Antioch
 Melkite Greek Catholic Eparchy of Saint-Sauveur of Montréal, subject to the Melkite Catholic Patriarch of Antioch
 Exarchate of Saints Cyril and Methodius of Toronto, with cathedral see in Toronto, Ontario; territory Slovak Greek Catholics subject to the Ruthenian Greek Catholic Byzantine Catholic Archeparchy of Pittsburgh
 Syro-Malabar Catholic Eparchy of Mississauga, subject to the major archbishop of the syro malabar Major Archiépiscopal church in Kerala, India 

See also USA for joint Armenian Catholic and Romanian Catholic dioceses and the personal ordinariate for former Anglicans

Episcopal Conference of Mexico 

Ecclesiastical province of Acapulco
Metropolitan Archdiocese of Acapulco
Diocese of Chilpancingo-Chilapa
Diocese of Ciudad Altamirano
Diocese of Tlapa

Ecclesiastical province of Tijuana (Baja California)
Metropolitan Archdiocese of Tijuana
Diocese of Ensenada
Diocese of La Paz en la Baja California Sur
Diocese of Mexicali

Ecclesiastical province of Léon (Bajío)
Metropolitan Archdiocese of León
Diocese of Celaya
Diocese of Irapuato
Diocese of Querétaro

Ecclesiastical province of Tuxtla Gutierrez (Chiapas)
Metropolitan Archdiocese of Tuxtla Gutiérrez
Diocese of San Cristóbal de Las Casas
Diocese of Tapachula

Ecclesiastical province of Chihuahua
Metropolitan Archdiocese of Chihuahua
Diocese of Ciudad Juárez
Diocese of Cuauhtémoc-Madera
Diocese of Nuevo Casas Grandes
Diocese of Parral
Diocese of Tarahumara

Ecclesiastical province of Durango
Metropolitan Archdiocese of Durango
Diocese of Gómez Palacio
Diocese of Mazatlán
Diocese of Torreón
Territorial Prelature of El Salto

Ecclesiastical province of Guadalajara
Metropolitan Archdiocese of Guadalajara
Diocese of Aguascalientes
Diocese of Autlán
Diocese of Ciudad Guzmán
Diocese of Colima
Diocese of San Juan de los Lagos
Diocese of Tepic
Territorial Prelature of Jesús María del Nayar

Ecclesiastical province of Hermosillo
Metropolitan Archdiocese of Hermosillo
Diocese of Ciudad Obregón
Diocese of Culiacán
Diocese of Nogales

Ecclesiastical province of Tulancingo (Hidalgo)
Metropolitan Archdiocese of Tulancingo
Diocese of Huejutla
Diocese of Tula

Ecclesiastical province of Jalapa (Xalapa)
Metropolitan Archdiocese of Jalapa
Diocese of Coatzacoalcos
Diocese of Córdoba
Diocese of Orizaba
Diocese of Papantla
Diocese of San Andrés Tuxtla
Diocese of Tuxpan
Diocese of Veracruz

Ecclesiastical province of México
Metropolitan Archdiocese of Mexico
Diocese of Azcapotzalco
Diocese of Iztapalapa
Diocese of Xochimilco

Ecclesiastical province of Monterrey
Metropolitan Archdiocese of Monterrey
Diocese of Ciudad Victoria
Diocese of Linares
Diocese of Matamoros
Diocese of Nuevo Laredo
Diocese of Piedras Negras
Diocese of Saltillo
Diocese of Tampico

Ecclesiastical province of Morelia
Metropolitan Archdiocese of Morelia
Diocese of Apatzingan
Diocese of Ciudad Lázaro Cárdenas
Diocese of Tacámbaro
Diocese of Zamora

Ecclesiastical province of (Antequera (de)) Oaxaca (Oaxaca)
Metropolitan Archdiocese of (Antequera (de)) Oaxaca
Diocese of Puerto Escondido
Diocese of Tehuantepec
Diocese of Tuxtepec
Territorial Prelature of Huautla
Territorial Prelature of Mixes

Ecclesiastical province of Puebla (de los Angeles)
Metropolitan Archdiocese of Puebla
Diocese of Huajuapan de León
Diocese of Tehuacán
Diocese of Tlaxcala

Ecclesiastical province of San Luis Potosí
Metropolitan Archdiocese of San Luis Potosí
Diocese of Ciudad Valles
Diocese of Matehuala
Diocese of Zacatecas

Ecclesiastical province of Tlalnepantla
Metropolitan Archdiocese of Tlalnepantla
Diocese of Cuautitlán
Diocese of Ecatepec
Diocese of Izcalli
Diocese of Netzahualcóyotl
Diocese of Teotihuacan
Diocese of Texcoco
Diocese of Valle de Chalco

Ecclesiastical province of Toluca
Metropolitan Archdiocese of Toluca
Diocese of Atlacomulco
Diocese of Cuernavaca
Diocese of Tenancingo

Ecclesiastical province of Yucatán
Metropolitan Archdiocese of Yucatán
Diocese of Campeche
Diocese of Tabasco
Diocese of Cancún-Chetumal

Episcopal Conference of Costa Rica 

Ecclesiastical province of San José de Costa Rica
 Metropolitan Archdiocese of San José de Costa Rica
Diocese of Alajuela
Diocese of Cartago
Diocese of Ciudad Quesada
Diocese of Limón
Diocese of Puntarenas
Diocese of San Isidro de El General
Diocese of Tilarán-Liberia

Episcopal Conference of El Salvador 

Exempt military ordinariate, immediately subject to the Holy See,
 Military Ordinariate of El Salvador

Ecclesiastical province of San Salvador, covering El Salvador
 Metropolitan Archdiocese of San Salvador
Diocese of Chalatenango
Diocese of San Miguel
Diocese of San Vicente
Diocese of Santa Ana
Diocese of Santiago de María
Diocese of Sonsonate
Diocese of Zacatecoluca

Episcopal Conference of Guatemala 

Exempt dioceses, immediately subject to the Holy See
 Apostolic Vicariate of El Petén
 Apostolic Vicariate of Izabal

Ecclesiastical province of Santiago de Guatemala
 Metropolitan Archdiocese of Santiago de Guatemala, in Ciudad de Guatemala
Diocese of Escuintla
Diocese of Jalapa
Diocese of San Francisco de Asís de Jutiapa
Diocese of Santa Rosa de Lima
Diocese of Verapaz, Cobán
Diocese of Zacapa y Santo Cristo de Esquipulas

Ecclesiastical province of Los Altos Quetzaltenango-Totonicapán
 Metropolitan Archdiocese of Los Altos Quetzaltenango-Totonicapán
Diocese of Huehuetenango
Diocese of Quiché
Diocese of San Marcos
Diocese of Sololá-Chimaltenango
Diocese of Suchitepéquez-Retalhuleu

Episcopal Conference of Honduras 

Ecclesiastical province of Tegucigalpa, covering Honduras
 Metropolitan Archdiocese of Tegucigalpa
Diocese of Choluteca
Diocese of Comayagua
Diocese of Danlí
Diocese of Gracias
Diocese of Juticalpa
Diocese of La Ceiba
Diocese of San Pedro Sula
Diocese of Santa Rosa de Copán
Diocese of Trujillo
Diocese of Yoro

Episcopal Conference of Nicaragua 

Ecclesiastical province of Managua, covering Nicaragua
 Metropolitan Archdiocese of Managua
Diocese of Bluefields
Diocese of Estelí
Diocese of Granada
Diocese of Jinotega
Diocese of Juigalpa
Diocese of León in Nicaragua
Diocese of Matagalpa
Diocese of Siuna

Episcopal Conference of Panama 

Exempt diocese, immediately subject to the Holy See
 Apostolic Vicariate of Darién

Ecclesiastical province of Panamá, covering Panama
 Metropolitan Archdiocese of Panamá
Diocese of Chitré
Diocese of Colón-Kuna Yala
Diocese of David
Diocese of Penonomé
Diocese of Santiago de Veraguas
Territorial Prelature of Bocas del Toro

Episcopal Conference of the (Lesser) Antilles (and Belize and Guyanas) 

the Diocese of Saint-Thomas, with see in Charlotte Amalie, on St. Thomas, on and for the U.S. Virgin Islands, is a suffragan of the mainland-North American Metropolitan Archdiocese of Washington (D.C.)

Ecclesiastical province of Castries - comprising several current and former British colonies in the Lesser Antilles.
 Metropolitan Archdiocese of Castries, with see at Castries on Saint Lucia
Diocese of Kingstown, on and for Saint Vincent and Grenadines
 Diocese of Roseau, with see at Roseau on Dominica
 Diocese of Saint George's in Grenada, with see on Grenada
 Diocese of Saint John's - Basseterre, with see at Saint John on Antigua and Barbuda, also for Anguilla, the British Virgin Islands, Montserrat and Saint Kitts and Nevis

Ecclesiastical province of Fort-de-France - comprising the French territories in the Caribbean.
Metropolitan Archdiocese of Fort-de-France, on and for Martinique
Diocese of Basse-Terre(-Pointe-à-Pitre), on Guadeloupe, also for Saint-Barthélemy and Saint-Martin
Diocese of Cayenne (Cajenna), in and for French Guiana (in South America)

Ecclesiastical province of Kingston in (and covering) Jamaica, also comprising several other former and current British colonies in the Western Caribbean.
 Metropolitan Archdiocese of Kingston in Jamaica, on Jamaica
Diocese of Mandeville, also on Jamaica
Diocese of Montego Bay, also on Jamaica
Mission Sui Iuris of Cayman Islands, on and for the Cayman Islands
Diocese of Belize City-Belmopan, in and for Belize (in Central America, formerly British Honduras)

Ecclesiastical province of Nassau - comprising several current and former British territories to the north of the Caribbean.
 Metropolitan Archdiocese of Nassau, on the Bahamas
Diocese of Hamilton (in Bermuda), on Bermuda
Mission Sui Iuris of Turks and Caicos, on and for the Turks and Caicos Islands

Ecclesiastical province of Port of Spain - comprising several former British or Dutch colonies in the southeastern Caribbean and northern South America.
 Metropolitan Archdiocese of Port of Spain, on and for Trinidad and Tobago
Diocese of Bridgetown, on and for Barbados
Diocese of Willemstad, on Curaçao in the Netherlands Antilles, also for Aruba, Bonaire, Saba, Sint Eustatius and Sint Maarten
Diocese of Georgetown, in Guyana (in South America, formerly British)
Diocese of Paramaribo, in Suriname (in South America, formerly Dutch Guyana)

Episcopal Conference of Cuba 

Ecclesiastical province of (San Cristóbal de) la Habana
 Metropolitan Archdiocese of (San Cristóbal de) la Habana, at La Havana
Diocese of Matanzas
Diocese of Pinar del Río

Ecclesiastical province of Camagüey
 Metropolitan Archdiocese of Camagüey
Diocese of Ciego de Avila
Diocese of Cienfuegos
Diocese of Santa Clara

Ecclesiastical province of Santiago de Cuba
 Metropolitan Archdiocese of Santiago de Cuba
Diocese of Guantánamo-Baracoa
Diocese of Holguín
Diocese of Santísimo Salvador de Bayamo y Manzanillo

Episcopal Conference of the Dominican Republic 

 exempt, i.e. immediately subject to the Holy See, but often held by the capital's archbishop
 Military Ordinariate of Dominican Republic

Ecclesiastical province of Santo Domingo
 Metropolitan Archdiocese of Santo Domingo, primatial see of America
Diocese of Baní
Diocese of Barahona
Diocese of Nuestra Señora de la Altagracia en Higüey
Diocese of San Juan de la Maguana
Diocese of San Pedro de Macorís

Ecclesiastical province of Santiago de los Caballeros
 Metropolitan Archdiocese of Santiago de los Caballeros
Diocese of La Vega
Diocese of Mao-Monte Cristi
Diocese of Puerto Plata
Diocese of San Francisco de Macorís

Episcopal Conference of Haiti 

Ecclesiastical province of Cap-Haïtien
 Metropolitan Archdiocese of Cap-Haïtien
Diocese of Fort-Liberté
Diocese of Hinche
Diocese of Les Gonaïves
Diocese of Port-de-Paix

Ecclesiastical province of Port-au-Prince
 Metropolitan Archdiocese of Port-au-Prince
Diocese of Anse-à-Veau and Miragoâne
Diocese of Jacmel
Diocese of Jérémie
Diocese of Les Cayes

Episcopal Conference of Puerto Rico 
Ecclesiastical province of San Juan de Puerto Rico, covering the Commonwealth of Puerto Rico
 Metropolitan Archdiocese of San Juan de Puerto Rico
Diocese of Arecibo
Diocese of Caguas
Diocese of Fajardo-Humacao
Diocese of Mayagüez
Diocese of Ponce

Episcopal Conference of the United States of America

 Exempt, immediately subject to the holy See and not part of a Bishops' Region
 Military Ordinariate of Archdiocese for the Military Services of the United States
 Personal Ordinariate of the Chair of St. Peter (former Anglicans)

Note: The United States Conference of Catholic Bishops (USCCB) divides the non-exempt dioceses of the United States (including Alaska, Hawaii, and the U.S. Virgin Islands) into fourteen geographical regions—termed "Bishops' Regions" for the Latin Church provinces—and a fifteenth "region" that consists of the Eastern Catholic eparchies. These regions are not the canonical "ecclesiastical regions" described in canon 433 and 434, but are operated by an elected regional chairman. However, the Ordinaries of Personal Ordinariates established under the auspices of Anglicanorum Coetibus are members of their respective Bishops’ Conferences, and the USCCB lists the exempt Personal Ordinariate of the Chair of St. Peter as a part of Bishops’ Region X.

Bishops' Region I
Ecclesiastical province of Boston, comprising the states of Maine, Massachusetts, New Hampshire and Vermont.
Metropolitan Archdiocese of Boston
Diocese of Burlington
Diocese of Fall River
Diocese of Manchester
Diocese of Portland
Diocese of Springfield in Massachusetts
Diocese of Worcester

Ecclesiastical province of Hartford, comprising the states of Connecticut and Rhode Island, as well as Fishers Island in the state of New York.
Metropolitan Archdiocese of Hartford
Diocese of Bridgeport
Diocese of Norwich
Diocese of Providence

Bishops' Region II
Ecclesiastical province of New York, comprising the state of New York except for Fishers Island.
Metropolitan Archdiocese of New York
Diocese of Albany
Diocese of Brooklyn
Diocese of Buffalo
Diocese of Ogdensburg
Diocese of Rochester
Diocese of Rockville Centre
Diocese of Syracuse

Bishops' Region III
Ecclesiastical province of Newark, comprising the state of New Jersey.
Metropolitan Archdiocese of Newark
Diocese of Camden
Diocese of Metuchen
Diocese of Paterson
Diocese of Trenton

Ecclesiastical province of Philadelphia, comprising the state of Pennsylvania.
Metropolitan Archdiocese of Philadelphia
Diocese of Allentown
Diocese of Altoona-Johnstown
Diocese of Erie
Diocese of Greensburg
Diocese of Harrisburg
Diocese of Pittsburgh
Diocese of Scranton

Bishops' Region IV
Ecclesiastical province of Baltimore, comprising most of the state of Maryland as well as the states of Delaware, Virginia and West Virginia.
 Metropolitan Archdiocese of Baltimore
Diocese of Arlington
Diocese of Richmond
Diocese of Wheeling-Charleston
Diocese of Wilmington

Ecclesiastical province of Washington, comprising the District of Columbia, 5 counties in southern Maryland, and the United States Virgin Islands.
 Metropolitan Archdiocese of Washington
 Diocese of Saint Thomas, with see in Charlotte Amalie, U.S. Virgin Islands (the bishops of the diocese are members of the USCCB and have observer status in the Antilles Episcopal Conference)

Bishops' Region V
Ecclesiastical province of Louisville, comprising the states of Kentucky and Tennessee.
Metropolitan Archdiocese of Louisville
Diocese of Covington
Diocese of Knoxville
Diocese of Lexington
Diocese of Memphis
Diocese of Nashville
Diocese of Owensboro

Ecclesiastical province of Mobile, comprising the states of Alabama and Mississippi.
Metropolitan Archdiocese of Mobile
Diocese of Biloxi
Diocese of Birmingham in Alabama
Diocese of Jackson

Ecclesiastical province of New Orleans, comprising the state of Louisiana.
Metropolitan Archdiocese of New Orleans
Diocese of Alexandria in Louisiana
Diocese of Baton Rouge
Diocese of Houma-Thibodaux
Diocese of Lafayette in Louisiana
Diocese of Lake Charles
Diocese of Shreveport

Bishops' Region VI
Ecclesiastical province of Cincinnati, comprising the state of Ohio.
Metropolitan Archdiocese of Cincinnati
Diocese of Cleveland
Diocese of Columbus
Diocese of Steubenville
Diocese of Toledo
Diocese of Youngstown

Ecclesiastical province of Detroit, comprising the state of Michigan.
Metropolitan Archdiocese of Detroit
Diocese of Gaylord
Diocese of Grand Rapids
Diocese of Kalamazoo
Diocese of Lansing
Diocese of Marquette
Diocese of Saginaw

Bishops' Region VII
Ecclesiastical province of Chicago, comprising the state of Illinois.
Metropolitan Archdiocese of Chicago
Diocese of Belleville
Diocese of Joliet in Illinois
Diocese of Peoria
Diocese of Rockford
Diocese of Springfield in Illinois

Ecclesiastical province of Indianapolis, comprising the state of Indiana.
Metropolitan Archdiocese of Indianapolis
Diocese of Evansville
Diocese of Fort Wayne-South Bend
Diocese of Gary
Diocese of Lafayette in Indiana

Ecclesiastical province of Milwaukee, comprising the state of Wisconsin.
Metropolitan Archdiocese of Milwaukee
Diocese of Green Bay
Diocese of La Crosse
Diocese of Madison
Diocese of Superior

Bishops' Region VIII 
Ecclesiastical province of Saint Paul and Minneapolis, comprising the states of Minnesota, North Dakota and South Dakota.
Metropolitan Archdiocese of Saint Paul and Minneapolis
Diocese of Bismarck
Diocese of Crookston
Diocese of Duluth
Diocese of Fargo
Diocese of New Ulm
Diocese of Rapid City
Diocese of Saint Cloud
Diocese of Sioux Falls
Diocese of Winona-Rochester

Bishops' Region IX
Ecclesiastical province of Dubuque, comprising the state of Iowa.
Metropolitan Archdiocese of Dubuque
Diocese of Davenport
Diocese of Des Moines
Diocese of Sioux City

Ecclesiastical province of Kansas City, comprising the state of Kansas.
Metropolitan Archdiocese of Kansas City in Kansas
Diocese of Dodge City
Diocese of Salina
Diocese of Wichita

Ecclesiastical province of Omaha, comprising the state of Nebraska.
Metropolitan Archdiocese of Omaha
Diocese of Grand Island
Diocese of Lincoln

Ecclesiastical province of Saint Louis, comprising the state of Missouri.
Metropolitan Archdiocese of St. Louis
Diocese of Jefferson City
Diocese of Kansas City-Saint Joseph
Diocese of Springfield-Cape Girardeau

Bishops' Region X
Ecclesiastical province of Galveston-Houston, comprising the east and southeast parts of the state of Texas.
Metropolitan Archdiocese of Galveston-Houston
Diocese of Austin
Diocese of Beaumont
Diocese of Brownsville
Diocese of Corpus Christi
Diocese of Tyler
Diocese of Victoria in Texas

Ecclesiastical province of San Antonio, comprising the west and north of the state of Texas.
Metropolitan Archdiocese of San Antonio
Diocese of Amarillo
Diocese of Dallas
Diocese of El Paso
Diocese of Fort Worth
Diocese of Laredo
Diocese of Lubbock
Diocese of San Angelo

Ecclesiastical province of Oklahoma City, comprising the states of Arkansas and Oklahoma.
Metropolitan Archdiocese of Oklahoma City
Diocese of Little Rock
Diocese of Tulsa

Personal Ordinariate of the Chair of St. Peter, comprising former Anglicans throughout the United States (and Canada).
Personal Ordinariate of the Chair of St. Peter

Bishops' Region XI
Ecclesiastical province of Los Angeles, comprising the southern part of the state of California.
Metropolitan Archdiocese of Los Angeles
Diocese of Fresno
Diocese of Monterey in California
Diocese of Orange (county, L.A.)
Diocese of San Bernardino
Diocese of San Diego

Ecclesiastical province of San Francisco, comprising the northern part of the state of California and the states of Hawaii (in Oceania), Nevada and Utah.
Metropolitan Archdiocese of San Francisco
Diocese of Las Vegas, in Nevada
Diocese of Oakland
Diocese of Reno, in Nevada
Diocese of Sacramento
Diocese of San Jose in California
Diocese of Santa Rosa in California
Diocese of Stockton
also Diocese of Honolulu, in Polynesia, i.e. in Oceania
(not fellow suffragan Diocese of Salt Lake City in Utah - Bishops' Region XIII)

Bishops' Region XII
Ecclesiastical province of Anchorage-Juneau, comprising the state of Alaska.
 Metropolitan Archdiocese of Anchorage-Juneau
Diocese of Fairbanks

Ecclesiastical province of Portland in Oregon, comprising the states of Idaho, Montana and Oregon, except for the parts of Yellowstone National Park in the states of Idaho and Montana.
Metropolitan Archdiocese of Portland in Oregon
Diocese of Baker
Diocese of Boise
Diocese of Great Falls-Billings
Diocese of Helena

Ecclesiastical province of Seattle, comprising the state of Washington
Metropolitan Archdiocese of Seattle
Diocese of Spokane
Diocese of Yakima

Bishops' Region XIII
A diocese from the ecclesiastical province of San Francisco.
Diocese of Salt Lake City

Ecclesiastical province of Denver, comprising the states of Colorado and Wyoming, as well as the parts of Yellowstone National Park in the states of Idaho and Montana.
Metropolitan Archdiocese of Denver
Diocese of Cheyenne
Diocese of Colorado Springs
Diocese of Pueblo

Ecclesiastical province of Santa Fe, comprising the states of Arizona and New Mexico.
Archdiocese of Santa Fe
Diocese of Gallup
Diocese of Las Cruces
Diocese of Phoenix
Diocese of Tucson

Bishops' Region XIV
Ecclesiastical province of Miami, comprising the state of Florida.
Metropolitan Archdiocese of Miami
Diocese of Orlando
Diocese of Palm Beach
Diocese of Pensacola-Tallahassee
Diocese of St. Augustine
Diocese of Saint Petersburg
Diocese of Venice in Florida

Ecclesiastical province of Atlanta, comprising the states of Georgia, North Carolina, and South Carolina.
Metropolitan Archdiocese of Atlanta
Diocese of Charleston
Diocese of Charlotte
Diocese of Raleigh
Diocese of Savannah

Bishops' Region XV
This is not a geographical region and it does not consist of ecclesiastical provinces. Instead, it consists exclusively of US branches of various, generally Europe- or Asia-based, particular Eastern Catholic Churches. See the Eastern Catholic Churches section (below) for their particular hierarchies.

Antiochian rites
Maronite Church
 Eparchy of Brooklyn (NYC, New York)
 Eparchy of Our Lady of Lebanon (St. Louis, Missouri)

Syriac Catholic Church
 Syriac Catholic Eparchy of Our Lady of Deliverance of Newark

Syro-Malankara Catholic Church
 Syro-Malankara Catholic Eparchy of St. Mary, Queen of Peace, of the United States of America and Canada

Armenian rite
Armenian Catholic Church
 Armenian Catholic Eparchy of Our Lady of Nareg in the United States of America  and Canada 

Byzantine (Constantinopolitan) rites
Melkite Greek Catholic Church
Eparchy of Newton

Romanian Catholic Church
Eparchy of St. George's in Canton for Romanians

Ruthenian Greek Catholic Church (only sui iuris Church headquartered in the Americas)
Ecclesiastical province of the Ruthenian Catholic Metropolitan Church of Pittsburgh
Metropolitan Archeparchy of Pittsburgh
Eparchy of Parma
Eparchy of Passaic
Holy Protection of Mary Eparchy of Phoenix

Ukrainian Greek Catholic Church
Ecclesiastical Province of Philadelphia
Metropolitan Archeparchy of Philadelphia
Eparchy of Saint Nicholas in Chicago for Ukrainians
Eparchy of Saint Josaphat in Parma
Eparchy of Stamford

Syro-Oriental Rites
Chaldean Catholic Church
 Eparchy of St. Peter the Apostle of San Diego
 Eparchy of St. Thomas the Apostle of Detroit

Syro-Malabar Catholic Church
 St. Thomas Syro-Malabar Catholic Diocese of Chicago

South America (Latin and Eastern Churches) 
 Exempt diocese, directly subject to the Holy See
 Apostolic Prefecture of Falkland Islands (Malvinas), for Falkland Islands (Malvinas) and South Georgia and the South Sandwich Islands (southern Atlantic UK overseas territories); part of the Episcopal Conference of England and Wales

Episcopal Conference of Argentina 

(Latin and Eastern Churches)

 exempt, immediately subject to the Holy See
 Military Ordinariate of Argentina

 Melkite Apostolic Exarchate of Argentina, a Byzantine rite, with cathedral see San Jorge in Cordoba
 Armenian Catholic Eparchy of San Gregorio de Narek in Buenos Aires, with cathedral see in Buenos Aires, Armenian Rite; presently vested in the Armenian Apostolic Exarchate of Latin America and Mexico
 Ordinariate for Eastern Catholics in Argentina, for all other Eastern particular churches (Byzantine and other rites), vested in the Latin Church Metropolitan Archbishop of capital Buenos Aires

Ecclesiastical province of Bahía Blanca
 Metropolitan Archdiocese of Bahía Blanca
Diocese of Alto Valle del Río Negro
Diocese of Comodoro Rivadavia
Diocese of Río Gallegos
Diocese of San Carlos de Bariloche
Diocese of Santa Rosa
Diocese of Viedma
Territorial Prelature of Esquel

Ecclesiastical province of Buenos Aires
 Metropolitan Archdiocese of Buenos Aires
 Diocese of Avellaneda-Lanús
 Diocese of Gregorio de Laferrère
 Diocese of Lomas de Zamora
 Diocese of Morón
Diocese of Quilmes
 Diocese of San Isidro
 Diocese of San Justo
 Diocese of San Martín
 Diocese of San Miguel
Maronite Catholic Eparchy of San Charbel in Buenos Aires, an Antiochene Rite eparchy (diocese)
 Ukrainian Catholic Eparchy of Santa María del Patrocinio in Buenos Aires, Ukrainian Catholic eparchy for the Byzantine Rite Ukrainian Catholic Church in all Argentina, with cathedral see in Buenos Aires

Ecclesiastical province of Córdoba
 Metropolitan Archdiocese of Córdoba
Diocese of Cruz del Eje
Diocese of Villa de la Concepción del Río Cuarto
Diocese of San Francisco
Diocese of Villa María
Territorial Prelature of Deán Funes

Ecclesiastical province of Corrientes
 Metropolitan Archdiocese of Corrientes
Diocese of Goya
Diocese of Oberá
Diocese of Posadas
Diocese of Puerto Iguazú
Diocese of Santo Tomé

Ecclesiastical province of La Plata
 Metropolitan Archdiocese of La Plata
Diocese of Azul
Diocese of Chascomús
Diocese of Mar del Plata

Ecclesiastical province of Mendoza
 Metropolitan Archdiocese of Mendoza
 Diocese of Neuquén
 Diocese of San Rafael

Ecclesiastical province of Mercedes-Luján
 Archdiocese of Mercedes-Luján
 Diocese of Merlo-Moreno
 Diocese of Nueve de Julio
 Diocese of Zárate-Campana

Ecclesiastical province of Paraná
 Metropolitan Archdiocese of Paraná
 Diocese of Concordia
 Diocese of Gualeguaychú

Ecclesiastical province of Resistencia
 Metropolitan Archdiocese of Resistencia
 Diocese of Formosa
 Diocese of San Roque de Presidencia Roque Sáenz Peña

Ecclesiastical province of Rosario
 Metropolitan Archdiocese of Rosario
 Diocese of San Nicolás de los Arroyos
 Diocese of Venado Tuerto

Ecclesiastical province of Salta
 Metropolitan Archdiocese of Salta
Diocese of Catamarca
Diocese of Jujuy
Diocese of Oran
Territorial Prelature of Cafayate
Territorial Prelature of Humahuaca

Ecclesiastical province of San Juan
 Metropolitan Archdiocese of San Juan de Cuyo
Diocese of La Rioja
Diocese of San Luis

Ecclesiastical province of Santa Fe
 Metropolitan Archdiocese of Santa Fe de la Vera Cruz
Diocese of Rafaela
Diocese of Reconquista

Ecclesiastical province of Tucumán
 Metropolitan Archdiocese of Tucumán
Diocese of Añatuya
Diocese of Concepción
Diocese of Santiago del Estero

Episcopal Conference of Bolivia 

 exempt, immediately subject to the Holy See
 Military Ordinariate of Bolivia
 Apostolic Vicariate of Camiri
 Apostolic Vicariate of El Beni
 Apostolic Vicariate of Ñuflo de Chávez
 Apostolic Vicariate of Pando
 Apostolic Vicariate of Reyes

Ecclesiastical province of Cochabamba
 Metropolitan Archdiocese of Cochabamba
Diocese of Oruro
Territorial Prelature of Aiquille

Ecclesiastical province of La Paz
 Metropolitan Archdiocese of La Paz
Diocese of Coroico
Diocese of El Alto
Territorial Prelature of Corocoro

Ecclesiastical province of Santa Cruz de la Sierra
 Metropolitan Archdiocese of Santa Cruz de la Sierra
Diocese of San Ignacio de Velasco

Ecclesiastical province of Sucre
Metropolitan Archdiocese of Sucre
Diocese of Potosí
Diocese of Tarija

Episcopal Conference of Brazil 

 Exempt, i.e. immediately subject to the Holy See
 Military Ordinariate of Brazil
 Personal Apostolic Administration of São João Maria Vianney, with cathedral see Igreja Principal do Imaculado Coração de Nossa Senhora do Rosário de Fátima, in Campos dos Goytacazes
 Armenian Catholic Apostolic Exarchate of Latin America and Mexico, with cathedral see in São Paulo; also covering Mexico and Uruguay (with co-cathedral in Montevideo)
 Ordinariate for Eastern Catholics in Brazil, for Eastern Catholics of all rites without proper see; cumulated with varying Latin Church Metropolitan sees

Ecclesiastical province of Aparecida
 Metropolitan Archdiocese of Aparecida
Diocese of Caraguatatuba
Diocese of Lorena
Diocese of São José dos Campos
Diocese of Taubaté

Ecclesiastical province of Aracaju
 Metropolitan Archdiocese of Aracaju
Diocese of Estância
Diocese of Propriá

Ecclesiastical province of Belém do Pará
 Metropolitan Archdiocese of Belém do Pará
Diocese of Abaetetuba
Diocese of Bragança do Pará
Diocese of Cametá
Diocese of Castanhal
Diocese of Macapá
Diocese of Marabá
Diocese of Ponta de Pedras
Diocese of (Santíssima) Conceição do Araguaia
Territorial Prelature of Marajó

Ecclesiastical province of Belo Horizonte
 Metropolitan Archdiocese of Belo Horizonte
Diocese of Divinópolis
Diocese of Luz
Diocese of Oliveira
Diocese of Sete Lagoas

Ecclesiastical province of Botucatu
 Metropolitan Archdiocese of Botucatu
Diocese of Araçatuba
Diocese of Assis
Diocese of Bauru
Diocese of Lins
Diocese of Marília
Diocese of Ourinhos
Diocese of Presidente Prudente

Ecclesiastical province of Brasília
 Metropolitan Archdiocese of Brasília
Diocese of Formosa
Diocese of Luziânia
Diocese of Uruaçu

Ecclesiastical province of Campinas
 Metropolitan Archdiocese of Campinas
Diocese of Amparo
Diocese of Bragança Paulista
Diocese of Limeira
Diocese of Piracicaba
Diocese of São Carlos

Ecclesiastical province of Campo Grande
 Metropolitan Archdiocese of Campo Grande
Diocese of Corumbá
Diocese of Coxim
Diocese of Dourados
Diocese of Jardim
Diocese of Naviraí
Diocese of Três Lagoas

Ecclesiastical province of Cascavel
 Metropolitan Archdiocese of Cascavel
Diocese of Foz do Iguaçu
Diocese of Palmas-Francisco Beltrão
Diocese of Toledo

Ecclesiastical province of Cuiabá
 Metropolitan Archdiocese of Cuiabá
Diocese of Barra do Garças
Diocese of Diamantino
Diocese of Juína
Diocese of Primavera do Leste–Paranatinga
Diocese of Rondonópolis-Guiratinga
Diocese of São Luíz de Cáceres
Territorial Prelature of São Félix

Ecclesiastical province of Curitiba
 Metropolitan Archdiocese of Curitiba
Diocese of Guarapuava
Diocese of Paranaguá
Diocese of Ponta Grossa
Diocese of União da Vitória
Diocese of São José dos Pinhais

Ecclesiastical province of Diamantina
 Metropolitan Archdiocese of Diamantina
Diocese of Almenara
Diocese of Araçuaí
Diocese of Guanhães
Diocese of Teófilo Otoni

Ecclesiastical province of Feira de Santana
 Metropolitan Archdiocese of Feira de Santana
Diocese of Barra do Rio Grande
Diocese of Barreiras
Diocese of Bonfim
Diocese of Irecê
Diocese of Juazeiro
Diocese of Paulo Afonso
Diocese of Ruy Barbosa
Diocese of Serrinha

Ecclesiastical province of Florianópolis
 Metropolitan Archdiocese of Florianópolis
Diocese of Blumenau
Diocese of Caçador
Diocese of Chapecó
Diocese of Criciúma
Diocese of Joaçaba
Diocese of Joinville
diocese of Lages
Diocese of Rio do Sul
Diocese of Tubarão

Ecclesiastical province of Fortaleza
 Metropolitan Archdiocese of Fortaleza
Diocese of Crateús
Diocese of Crato
Diocese of Iguatú
Diocese of Itapipoca
Diocese of Limoeiro do Norte
Diocese of Quixadá
Diocese of Sobral
Diocese of Tianguá

Ecclesiastical province of Goiânia
 Metropolitan Archdiocese of Goiânia
Diocese of Anápolis
Diocese of Goiás
Diocese of Ipameri
Diocese of Itumbiara
Diocese of Jataí
Diocese of Rubiataba-Mozarlândia
Diocese of São Luís de Montes Belos

Ecclesiastical province of Juiz de Fora
 Metropolitan Archdiocese of Juiz de Fora
Diocese of Leopoldina
Diocese of São João del Rei

Ecclesiastical province of Londrina
 Metropolitan Archdiocese of Londrina
Diocese of Apucarana
Diocese of Cornélio Procópio
Diocese of Jacarezinho

Ecclesiastical province of Maceió
 Metropolitan Archdiocese of Maceió
Diocese of Palmeira dos Índios
Diocese of Penedo

Ecclesiastical province of Manaus
 Metropolitan Archdiocese of Manaus
Diocese of Alto Solimões
Diocese of Borba
Diocese of Coari
Diocese of Parintins
Diocese of Roraima
Diocese of São Gabriel da Cachoeira
Territorial Prelature of Itacoatiara
Territorial Prelature of Tefé

Ecclesiastical province of Mariana
 Metropolitan Archdiocese of Mariana
Diocese of Caratinga
Diocese of Governador Valadares
Diocese of Itabira–Fabriciano

Ecclesiastical province of Maringá
 Metropolitan Archdiocese of Maringá
Diocese of Campo Mourão
Diocese of Paranavaí
Diocese of Umuarama

Ecclesiastical province of Montes Claros
 Metropolitan Archdiocese of Montes Claros
Diocese of Janaúba
Diocese of Januária
Diocese of Paracatu

Ecclesiastical province of Natal
 Metropolitan Archdiocese of Natal
Diocese of Caicó
Diocese of Mossoró

Ecclesiastical province of Niterói
 Metropolitan Archdiocese of Niterói (Nictheroy)
Diocese of Campos
Diocese of Nova Friburgo
Diocese of Petrópolis

Ecclesiastical province of Olinda e Recife
 Metropolitan Archdiocese of Olinda e Recife
Diocese of Afogados da Ingazeira
Diocese of Caruaru
Diocese of Floresta
Diocese of Garanhuns
Diocese of Nazaré
Diocese of Palmares
Diocese of Pesqueira
Diocese of Petrolina
Diocese of Salgueiro

Ecclesiastical province of Palmas
 Metropolitan Archdiocese of Palmas
Diocese of Cristalândia
Diocese of Miracema do Tocantins
Diocese of Porto Nacional
Diocese of Tocantinópolis

Ecclesiastical province of Paraíba
 Metropolitan Archdiocese of Paraíba
Diocese of Cajazieras
Diocese of Campina Grande
Diocese of Guarabira
Diocese of Patos

Ecclesiastical province of Passo Fundo
 Metropolitan Archdiocese of Passo Fundo
Diocese of Erexim
Diocese of Frederico Westphalen
Diocese of Vacaria

Ecclesiastical province of Pelotas
 Metropolitan Archdiocese of Pelotas
Diocese of Bagé
Diocese of Rio Grande

Ecclesiastical province of Porto Alegre
 Metropolitan Archdiocese of Porto Alegre
Diocese of Caxias do Sul
Diocese of Cruzeiro do Sul
Diocese of Montenegro
Diocese of Novo Hamburgo
Diocese of Osório

Ecclesiastical province of Porto Velho
 Metropolitan Archdiocese of Porto Velho
Diocese of Guajará-Mirim
Diocese of Humaitá
Diocese of Ji-Paraná
Diocese of Rio Branco
Territorial Prelature of Lábrea

Ecclesiastical province of Pouso Alegre
 Metropolitan Archdiocese of Pouso Alegre
Diocese of Campanha
Diocese of Guaxupé

Ecclesiastical province of Ribeirão Preto
 Metropolitan Archdiocese of Ribeirão Preto
Diocese of Barretos
Diocese of Catanduva
Diocese of Franca
Diocese of Jaboticabal
Diocese of Jales
Diocese of São João da Boa Vista
Diocese of São José do Rio Preto
Diocese of Votuporanga

Ecclesiastical province of Santa Maria
 Metropolitan Archdiocese of Santa Maria
Diocese of Cachoeira do Sul
Diocese of Cruz Alta
Diocese of Santa Cruz do Sul
Diocese of Santo Ângelo
Diocese of Uruguaiana

Ecclesiastical province of Santarem
Metropolitan Archdiocese of Santarém
Diocese of Óbidos
Diocese of Xingu-Altamira
Territorial Prelature of Alto Xingu-Tucumã
Territorial Prelature of Itaituba

Ecclesiastical province of São João Batista em Curitiba (Ukrainian Catholic, a Byzantine Rite)
 Metropolitan Archeparchy of São João Batista em Curitiba
Eparchy of Imaculada Conceição in Prudentópolis

Ecclesiastical province of São Luís do Maranhão
 Metropolitan Archdiocese of São Luís do Maranhão
Diocese of Bacabal
Diocese of Balsas
Diocese of Brejo
Diocese of Carolina
Diocese of Caxias do Maranhão
Diocese of Coroatá
Diocese of Grajaú
Diocese of Imperatriz
Diocese of Pinheiro
Diocese of Viana
Diocese of Zé-Doca

Ecclesiastical province of São Paulo (Roman and Byzantine rites)
 Metropolitan Archdiocese of São Paulo
Diocese of Campo Limpo
Diocese of Guarulhos
Diocese of Mogi das Cruzes
Diocese of Osasco
Diocese of Santo Amaro
Diocese of Santo André
Diocese of Santos
Diocese of São Miguel Paulista
Maronite Catholic Eparchy of Our Lady of Lebanon of São Paulo
Melkite Greek Catholic Eparchy of Nossa Senhora do Paraíso em São Paulo

Ecclesiastical province of São Salvador da Bahia
 Metropolitan Archdiocese of São Salvador da Bahia
Diocese of Alagoinhas
Diocese of Amargosa
Diocese of Camaçari
Diocese of Cruz das Almas
Diocese of Eunápolis
Diocese of Ilhéus
Diocese of Itabuna
Diocese of Teixeira de Freitas-Caravelas

Ecclesiastical province of São Sebastião do Rio de Janeiro
 Metropolitan Archdiocese of São Sebastião do Rio de Janeiro
Diocese of Barra do Piraí-Volta Redonda
Diocese of Duque de Caxias
Diocese of Itaguaí
Diocese of Nova Iguaçu
Diocese of Valença

Ecclesiastical province of Sorocaba
 Metropolitan Archdiocese of Sorocaba
Diocese of Itapetininga
Diocese of Itapeva
Diocese of Jundiaí
Diocese of Registro

Ecclesiastical province of Teresina
 Metropolitan Archdiocese of Teresina
Diocese of Bom Jesus do Gurguéia
Diocese of Campo Maior
Diocese of Floriano
Diocese of Oeiras
Diocese of Parnaíba
Diocese of Picos
Diocese of São Raimundo Nonato

Ecclesiastical province of Uberaba
 Metropolitan Archdiocese of Uberaba
Diocese of Ituiutaba
Diocese of Patos de Minas
Diocese of Uberlândia

Ecclesiastical province of Vitória
 Metropolitan Archdiocese of Vitória
Diocese of Cachoeiro de Itapemirim
Diocese of Colatina
Diocese of São Mateus

Ecclesiastical province of Vitória da Conquista
 Metropolitan Archdiocese of Vitória da Conquista
Diocese of Bom Jesus da Lapa
Diocese of Caetité
Diocese of Jequié
Diocese of Livramento de Nossa Senhora

Episcopal Conference of Chile 

 exempt, immediately subject to the Holy See
 Military Ordinariate of Chile
 Apostolic Vicariate of Aysén

Ecclesiastical province of Antofagasta
 Metropolitan Archdiocese of Antofagasta
Diocese of Arica
Diocese of Iquique
Diocese of Calama

Ecclesiastical province of Concepción
 Metropolitan Archdiocese of Concepción
Diocese of Chillán
Diocese of Los Ángeles
Diocese of Temuco
Diocese of Valdivia
Diocese of Villarrica

Ecclesiastical province of La Serena
 Metropolitan Archdiocese of La Serena
Diocese of Copiapó
Territorial Prelature of Illapel

Ecclesiastical province of Puerto Montt
Metropolitan Archdiocese of Puerto Montt
Diocese of Osorno
Diocese of Punta Arenas
Diocese of San Carlos de Ancud

Ecclesiastical province of Santiago de Chile
 Metropolitan Archdiocese of Santiago de Chile
Diocese of Linares
Diocese of Melipilla
Diocese of Rancagua
Diocese of San Bernardo
Diocese of San Felipe
Diocese of Talca
Diocese of Valparaíso

Episcopal Conference of Colombia 

 exempt, immediately subject to the Holy See
 Military Ordinariate of Colombia
 Maronite Catholic Apostolic Exarchate of Colombia
 Apostolic Vicariate of Guapi
 Apostolic Vicariate of Inírida
 Apostolic Vicariate of Leticia
 Apostolic Vicariate of Mitú
 Apostolic Vicariate of Puerto Carreño
 Apostolic Vicariate of Puerto Gaitán
 Apostolic Vicariate of Puerto Leguízamo-Solano
 Apostolic Vicariate of San Andrés y Providencia
 Apostolic Vicariate of Tierradentro
 Apostolic Vicariate of Trinidad

Ecclesiastical province of Barranquilla
 Metropolitan Archdiocese of Barranquilla
Diocese of El Banco
Diocese of Riohacha
Diocese of Santa Marta
Diocese of Valledupar

Ecclesiastical province of Bogotá
 Metropolitan Archdiocese of Bogotá
Diocese of Engativá
Diocese of Facatativá
Diocese of Fontibón
Diocese of Girardot
Diocese of Soacha
Diocese of Zipaquirá

Ecclesiastical province of Bucaramanga
 Metropolitan Archdiocese of Bucaramanga
Diocese of Barrancabermeja
Diocese of Málaga-Soatá
Diocese of Socorro y San Gil
Diocese of Vélez

Ecclesiastical province of Cali
 Metropolitan Archdiocese of Cali
Diocese of Buenaventura
Diocese of Buga
Diocese of Cartago
Diocese of Palmira

Ecclesiastical province of Cartagena
 Metropolitan Archdiocese of Cartagena
Diocese of Magangué
Diocese of Montelibano
Diocese of Montería
Diocese of Sincelejo

Ecclesiastical province of Florencia
Metropolitan Archdiocese of Florencia
Diocese of Mocoa–Sibundoy  
Diocese of San Vicente del Caguán

Ecclesiastical province of Ibagué
 Metropolitan Archdiocese of Ibagué
Diocese of Espinal
Diocese of Garzón
Diocese of Líbano–Honda
Diocese of Neiva

Ecclesiastical province of Manizales
 Metropolitan Archdiocese of Manizales
Diocese of Armenia
Diocese of La Dorada-Guaduas
Diocese of Pereira

Ecclesiastical province of Medellín
 Metropolitan Archdiocese of Medellín
Diocese of Caldas
Diocese of Girardota
Diocese of Jericó
Diocese of Sonsón-Rionegro

Ecclesiastical province of Nueva Pamplona
 Metropolitan Archdiocese of Nueva Pamplona
Diocese of Arauca
Diocese of Cúcuta
Diocese of Ocaña
Diocese of Tibú

Ecclesiastical province of Popayán
 Metropolitan Archdiocese of Popayán
Diocese of Ipiales
Diocese of Pasto
Diocese of Tumaco

Ecclesiastical province of Santa Fe de Antioquia
 Metropolitan Archdiocese of Santa Fe de Antioquia
Diocese of Apartadó
Diocese of Ismina-Tadó
Diocese of Quibdó
Diocese of Santa Rosa de Osos

Ecclesiastical province of Tunja
 Metropolitan Archdiocese of Tunja
Diocese of Chiquinquirá
Diocese of Duitama-Sogamoso
Diocese of Garagoa
Diocese of Yopal

Ecclesiastical province of Villavicencio
 Metropolitan Archdiocese of Villavicencio
Diocese of Granada en Colombia
Diocese of San José del Guaviare

Episcopal Conference of Ecuador 

 exempt missionary circonscriptions, immediately subject to the Holy See
 Military Ordinariate of Ecuador
 Apostolic Vicariate of Aguarico
 Apostolic Vicariate of Esmeraldas
 Apostolic Vicariate of Galápagos
 Apostolic Vicariate of Méndez
 Apostolic Vicariate of Napo
 Apostolic Vicariate of Puyo
 Apostolic Vicariate of San Miguel de Sucumbíos
 Apostolic Vicariate of Zamora en Ecuador

Ecclesiastical province of Cuenca
 Metropolitan Archdiocese of Cuenca
Diocese of Azogues
Diocese of Loja
Diocese of Machala

Ecclesiastical province of Guayaquil
 Metropolitan Archdiocese of Guayaquil
Diocese of Babahoyo
Diocese of Daule
Diocese of San Jacinto
Diocese of Santa Elena

Ecclesiastical province of Portoviejo
Metropolitan Archdiocese of Portoviejo
Diocese of Santo Domingo de los Colorados

Ecclesiastical province of Quito
 Metropolitan Archdiocese of Quito
Diocese of Ambato
Diocese of Guaranda
Diocese of Ibarra
Diocese of Latacunga
Diocese of Riobamba
Diocese of Tulcán

Episcopal Conference of Paraguay 

 exempt, immediately subject to the Holy See
 Military Ordinariate of Paraguay
 Apostolic Vicariate of Chaco Paraguayo
 Apostolic Vicariate of Pilcomayo

Ecclesiastical province of Asunción
 Metropolitan Archdiocese of Asunción
Diocese of Benjamín Aceval
Diocese of Caacupé
Diocese of Carapeguá
Diocese of Ciudad del Este
Diocese of Concepción en Paraguay
Diocese of Coronel Oviedo
Diocese of Encarnación
Diocese of San Juan Bautista de las Misiones
Diocese of San Lorenzo
Diocese of San Pedro
Diocese of Villarrica del Espíritu Santo

Episcopal Conference of Peru 

 exempt, immediately subject to the Holy See
 Military Ordinariate of Peru
 Apostolic Vicariate of Iquitos
 Apostolic Vicariate of Jaén en Perú
 Apostolic Vicariate of Pucallpa
 Apostolic Vicariate of Puerto Maldonado
 Apostolic Vicariate of Requena
 Apostolic Vicariate of San José de Amazonas
 Apostolic Vicariate of San Ramón
 Apostolic Vicariate of Yurimaguas

Ecclesiastical province of Arequipa
 Metropolitan Archdiocese of Arequipa
Diocese of Puno
Diocese of Tacna y Moquegua
Territorial Prelature of Ayaviri
Territorial Prelature of Chuquibamba
Territorial Prelature of Juli
Territorial Prelature of Santiago Apóstol de Huancané

Ecclesiastical province of Ayacucho
 Metropolitan Archdiocese of Ayacucho
Diocese of Huancavélica
Territorial Prelature of Caravelí

Ecclesiastical province of Cuzco
 Metropolitan Archdiocese of Cuzco
Diocese of Abancay
Diocese of Sicuani
Territorial Prelature of Chuquibambilla

Ecclesiastical province of Huancayo
 Metropolitan Archdiocese of Huancayo
Diocese of Huánuco
Diocese of Tarma

Ecclesiastical province of Lima
 Metropolitan Archdiocese of Lima
Diocese of Callao
Diocese of Carabayllo
Diocese of Chosica
Diocese of Huacho
Diocese of Ica
Diocese of Lurín
Territorial Prelature of Yauyos

Ecclesiastical province of Piura
 Metropolitan Archdiocese of Piura
Diocese of Chachapoyas
Diocese of Chiclayo
Diocese of Chulucanas
Territorial Prelature of Chota

Ecclesiastical province of Trujillo
 Metropolitan Archdiocese of Trujillo
Diocese of Cajamarca
Diocese of Chimbote
Diocese of Huaraz
Diocese of Huarí
Territorial Prelature of Huamachuco
Territorial Prelature of Moyobamba

Episcopal Conference of Uruguay 

Ecclesiastical province of Montevideo
 Metropolitan Archdiocese of Montevideo
Diocese of Canelones
Diocese of Florida
Diocese of Maldonado-Punta del Este-Minas
Diocese of Melo
Diocese of Mercedes
Diocese of Salto
Diocese of San José de Mayo
Diocese of Tacuarembó

Episcopal Conference of Venezuela 

 Exempt, i.e. immediately subject to the Holy See
 Military Ordinariate of Venezuela
 Roman Catholic missionary circonscriptions:
 Apostolic Vicariate of Caroní
 Apostolic Vicariate of Puerto Ayacucho
 Apostolic Vicariate of Tucupita
 Eastern dioceses:
 Melkite Greek Catholic Apostolic Exarchate of Venezuela (Byzantine Rite), with cathedral see in Caracas
 Syriac Catholic Apostolic Exarchate of Venezuela (Antiochian Rite), with cathedral see at Maracay, Aragua

Ecclesiastical province of Barquisimeto
 Metropolitan Archdiocese of Barquisimeto
Diocese of Acarigua–Araure
Diocese of Carora
Diocese of Guanare
Diocese of San Felipe

Ecclesiastical province of Calabozo
 Metropolitan Archdiocese of Calabozo
Diocese of San Fernando de Apure
Diocese of Valle de la Pascua

Ecclesiastical province of Caracas, Santiago de Venezuela
 Metropolitan Archdiocese of Caracas, Santiago de Venezuela
Diocese of Guarenas
Diocese of La Guaira
Diocese of Los Teques
Diocese of Petare

Ecclesiastical province of Ciudad Bolívar
 Metropolitan Archdiocese of Ciudad Bolívar
Diocese of Ciudad Guayana
Diocese of Maturín

Ecclesiastical province of Coro
 Metropolitan Archdiocese of Coro
Diocese of Punto Fijo

Ecclesiastical province of Cumaná
 Metropolitan Archdiocese of Cumaná
Diocese of Barcelona
Diocese of Carúpano
Diocese of El Tigre
Diocese of Margarita

Ecclesiastical province of Maracaibo
 Metropolitan Archdiocese of Maracaibo
Diocese of Cabimas
Diocese of El Vigia-San Carlos del Zulia
Diocese of Machiques

Ecclesiastical province of Mérida in Venezuela
 Metropolitan Archdiocese of Mérida in Venezuela
Diocese of Barinas
Diocese of Guasdualito
Diocese of San Cristóbal de Venezuela
Diocese of Trujillo

Ecclesiastical province of Valencia en Venezuela
 Metropolitan Archdiocese of Valencia en Venezuela
Diocese of Maracay
Diocese of Puerto Cabello
Diocese of San Carlos de Venezuela

Asia (Latin and Eastern Churches)

Exempt dioceses or mission sui juris in Asian countries without episcopal conferences or ecclesiastical provinces 

 exempt, nation-covering diocesan circonscriptions, often not called after the see, each immediately subject to the Holy See
 Apostolic Prefecture of Baku, in and for all Azerbaijan
 Apostolic Administration of Kyrgyzstan, in Bishkek, for all Kyrgyzstan
 Apostolic Vicariate of Nepal, in Kathmandu, for all Nepal
 Apostolic Administration of Uzbekistan, in Tashkent, for all Uzbekistan
 Apostolic Administration of Kazakhstan and Central Asia for Faithful of Byzantine Rite, in Karaganda, for Kazakhstan, Kyrgyzstan, Tajikistan, Turkmenistan and Uzbekistan

 Missions sui juris (not requiring a prelate; just an ecclesiastical superior), immediately subject to the Holy See
 Mission sui juris of Afghanistan, in Kabul, for all Afghanistan
 Mission sui juris of Tajikistan, for all Tajikistan
 Mission sui juris of Turkmenistan, in Ashgabat, for all Turkmenistan

Episcopal conference of the Arab region Latin bishops (includes parts of North and Eastern Africa) 

all Latin dioceses are exempt, i.e. no ecclesiastical province, but each immediately subject to the Holy See. They alone constitute the Episcopal conference proper, not the numerous Eastern Catholic Ordinaries, who are grouped in specific 'national' Assemblies below

 in Asian Middle East:
 Latin Patriarchate of Jerusalem, no suffragan, for all of the Holy Land (Palestine & Israel), Jordan and Cyprus
 Archdiocese of Baghdad, no suffragan, for all of Iraq
 Apostolic Vicariate of Aleppo, for all of Syria
 Apostolic Vicariate of Beirut, for all of Lebanon
 Apostolic Vicariate of Northern Arabia, in Kuwait City, for all of Kuwait, Bahrain, Saudi Arabia and Qatar
 Apostolic Vicariate of Southern Arabia, in Abu Dhabi (UAE), for all of Oman, United Arab Emirates and Yemen

 in Africa: see there (for Egypt, Djibouti and Somalia)

Assembly of Catholic Ordinaries of Egypt 

see Africa

Assembly of Catholic Ordinaries of the Holy Land (Palestine/Israel & Jordan) 

 Syriac Catholic Patriarchal Exarchate of Jerusalem, with cathedral see in Jerusalem, for the Holy Land (Palestine and Israel) and Jordan

Assembly of Catholic Ordinaries of Iraq 

 Syriac Catholic Archeparchy of Baghdad, Archeparchy for central Iraq
 Syriac Catholic Patriarchal Exarchate of Basra and the Gulf, for southern Iraq and Kuwait
 Syriac Catholic Archeparchy of Mosul, Archeparchy for northern Iraq

Assembly of Catholic Ordinaries of Lebanon 

 Syriac Catholic Patriarchate of Antioch, with a cathedral see in Beirut, for Lebanon
 Syriac Catholic Eparchy of Beirut

Assembly of Catholic Ordinaries in Syria 

 Syriac Catholic Archeparchy of Aleppo, Archeparchy for part of Syria (cfr. infra)
 Syriac Metropolitan Archeparchy of Damascus 
 Syriac Catholic Archeparchy of Hassaké–Nisibi, Archeparchy for part of Syria (cfr. infra)
 Syriac Metropolitan Archeparchy of Homs

Episcopal Conference of Iran 

No ecclesiastical province, the Latin Church has only the exempt Roman Catholic Archdiocese of Teheran-Isfahan, directly subject to the Holy See

The conference also includes Eastern Catholic bishops of two churches:
 Chaldean Rite - four dioceses - archdioceses Ahvaz, Tehran (Metropolitan), Urmyā (Shahpur) and its sole suffragan, Salmas
 Armenian Rite - diocese of Isfahan

Episcopal Conference of Kazakhstan 

Ecclesiastical Province of Mary Most Holy in Astana, covering all Kazakhstan
 Metropolitan Archdiocese of Mary Most Holy in Astana
 Diocese of Most Holy Trinity in Almaty
 Diocese of Karaganda
 Apostolic Administration of Atyrau

Episcopal Conference of Turkey 

covering transcontinental Turkey, which is not comprised in any Latin ecclesiastical province
 Archdiocese of Izmir (in Asia Minor), nominally Metropolitan but no suffragan

Exempt Latin dioceses, immediately subject to the Holy See
 Apostolic Vicariate of Istanbul, in Istanbul (formerly Constantinople), partly in and for European Turkey
 Apostolic Vicariate of Anatolia, in Iskenderun

Eastern (arch)dioceses, directly subject to their Patriarchs
 Armenian Catholic Archeparchy of Istanbul, directly under the Armenian Catholic Patriarch of Cilicia, whose ancient see takes its title from a region in Turkey, yet his actual see is in Lebanon.
 Chaldean Catholic Archeparchy of Diarbekir (Amida), immediately subject to the patriarch of Babylon
 Greek-Melkite Patriarchal Exarchate of Istanbul, directly subject to the Melkite Catholic Patriarch of Antioch (Byzantine Rite in Greek)
 Syriac Catholic Patriarchal Exarchate of Turkey, immediately under the Syriac Catholic Patriarch of Antioch (Antiochian Rite)

Episcopal Conference of Bangladesh 

Catholic Bishops' Conference of Bangladesh

Ecclesiastical Province of Dhaka
 Metropolitan Archdiocese of Dhaka
Diocese of Dinajpur
Diocese of Mymensingh
Diocese of Rajshahi
Diocese of Sylhet

Ecclesiastical Province of Chittagong
 Metropolitan Diocese of Chittagong
Diocese of Barisal
Diocese of Khulna

Episcopal Conference of Burma (Myanmar) 

Ecclesiastical Province of Mandalay
Metropolitan Archdiocese of Mandalay
Diocese of Banmaw
Diocese of Hakha
Diocese of Kalay
Diocese of Lashio
Diocese of Myitkyina

Ecclesiastical Province of Taunggyi
Metropolitan Archdiocese of Taunggyi
Diocese of Kengtung
Diocese of Loikaw
Diocese of Pekhon
Diocese of Taungngu

Ecclesiastical Province of Yangon (Rangoon)
Metropolitan Archdiocese of Yangon (Rangoon)
Diocese of Hpa-an
Diocese of Mawlamyine
Diocese of Pathein
Diocese of Pyay

Episcopal Conference of East Timor 

 Metropolitan Archdiocese of Díli
 Diocese of Baucau
 Diocese of Maliana

Episcopal Conference of India, including Bhutan 

includes (italicized) various Eastern Church dioceses, notably Syro-Malankara (an Antiochian Rite) and Syro-Malabar (a Syro-Oriental Rite), either in Eastern provinces of their own particular churches, exempt or (some Syro-Malabar) as suffragans of Roman Catholic Metropolitan Archbishops in their mixed-rite ecclesiastical provinces

Exempt Eastern Catholic eparchies (diocese), immediately subject to the Holy See
 Syro-Malabar Catholic Eparchy of Faridabad, see near Delhi, also serves Haryana, Punjab, Himachal Pradesh, Jammu and Kashmir and parts of Uttar Pradesh
 Syro-Malabar Catholic Eparchy of Hosur
 Syro-Malabar Catholic Eparchy of Shamshabad
 Syro-Malankara Catholic Eparchy of Gurgaon, see located near Delhi, serving 22 states in India
 Syro-Malankara Catholic Eparchy of Parassala

Ecclesiastical Province of Agra
Metropolitan Archdiocese of Agra
Diocese of Ajmer
Diocese of Allahabad
Diocese of Bareilly
 Syro-Malabar Catholic Eparchy of Bijnor
 Syro-Malabar Catholic Eparchy of Gorakhpur
Diocese of Jaipur
Diocese of Jhansi
Diocese of Lucknow
Diocese of Meerut
Diocese of Udaipur
Diocese of Varanasi

Ecclesiastical Province of Bangalore (entirely Latin Church)
Metropolitan Archdiocese of Bangalore
Diocese of Belgaum
Diocese of Bellary
Diocese of Chikmagalur
Diocese of Gulbarga
Diocese of Karwar
Diocese of Mangalore
Diocese of Mysore
Diocese of Shimoga
Diocese of Udupi

Ecclesiastical Province of Bhopal
Metropolitan Archdiocese of Bhopal
Diocese of Gwalior
Diocese of Indore
Diocese of Jabalpur
Diocese of Jhabua
Diocese of Khandwa,
 Syro-Malabar Catholic Eparchy of Sagar
 Syro-Malabar Catholic Eparchy of Satna
 Syro-Malabar Catholic Eparchy of Ujjain

Ecclesiastical Province of Bombay
Metropolitan Archdiocese of Bombay
Syro-Malabar Catholic Eparchy of Kalyan, see located near Bombay, but serves all of Maharashtra state
Diocese of Nashik
Diocese of Poona
Diocese of Vasai

Ecclesiastical Province of Calcutta (entirely Latin Church)
Metropolitan Archdiocese of Calcutta
Diocese of Asansol
Diocese of Bagdogra
Diocese of Baruipur
Diocese of Darjeeling, including all Bhutan
Diocese of Jalpaiguri
Diocese of Krishnagar
Diocese of Raiganj

Ecclesiastical Province of Cuttack-Bhubaneswar (entirely Latin Church)
Metropolitan Archdiocese of Cuttack-Bhubaneswar
Diocese of Balasore
Diocese of Berhampur
Diocese of Rayagada
Diocese of Rourkela
Diocese of Sambalpur

Ecclesiastical Province of Delhi (entirely Latin Church)
Metropolitan Archdiocese of Delhi
Diocese of Jammu-Srinagar
Diocese of Jalandhar
Diocese of Simla and Chandigarh

Ecclesiastical Province of Gandhinagar
Metropolitan Archdiocese of Gandhinagar
Diocese of Ahmedabad
Diocese of Baroda
Syro-Malabar Catholic Eparchy of Rajkot

Ecclesiastical Province of Goa and Daman (entirely Latin Church)
 Metropolitan Archdiocese of Goa and Daman, primatial see of the East, Patriarchate of the East Indies
 Diocese of Sindhudurg

Ecclesiastical Province of Guwahati (entirely Latin Church)
Metropolitan Archdiocese of Guwahati
Diocese of Bongaigaon
Diocese of Dibrugarh
Diocese of Diphu
Diocese of Itanagar
Diocese of Miao
Diocese of Tezpur

Ecclesiastical Province of Hyderabad
Metropolitan Archdiocese of Hyderabad
Syro-Malabar Catholic Eparchy of Adilabad
Diocese of Cuddapah
Diocese of Khammam
Diocese of Kurnool
Diocese of Nalgonda
Diocese of Warangal

Ecclesiastical Province of Imphal (entirely Latin Church)
 Metropolitan Archdiocese of Imphal
 Diocese of Kohima

Ecclesiastical Province of Madras and Mylapore (entirely Latin Church)
Metropolitan Archdiocese of Madras and Mylapore
Diocese of Chingleput
Diocese of Coimbatore
Diocese of Ootacamund
Diocese of Vellore

Ecclesiastical Province of Madurai (entirely Latin Church)
Metropolitan Archdiocese of Madurai
Diocese of Dindigul
Diocese of Kottar
Diocese of Kuzhithurai
Diocese of Palayamkottai
Diocese of Sivagangai
Diocese of Tiruchirapalli
Diocese of Tuticorin

Ecclesiastical Province of Nagpur
Metropolitan Archdiocese of Nagpur
Diocese of Amravati
Diocese of Aurangabad
Syro-Malabar Catholic Eparchy of Chanda

Ecclesiastical Province of Patna (entirely Latin Church)
Metropolitan Archdiocese of Patna
Diocese of Bettiah
Diocese of Bhagalpur
Diocese of Buxar
Diocese of Muzaffarpur
Diocese of Purnea

Ecclesiastical Province of Pondicherry and Cuddalore (entirely Latin Church)
Metropolitan Archdiocese of Pondicherry and Cuddalore
Diocese of Dharmapuri
Diocese of Kumbakonam
Diocese of Salem
Diocese of Tanjore

Ecclesiastical Province of Raipur
Metropolitan Archdiocese of Raipur
Diocese of Ambikapur
Syro-Malabar Catholic Eparchy of Jagdalpur
Diocese of Jashpur
Diocese of Raigarh

Ecclesiastical Province of Ranchi (entirely Latin Church)
Metropolitan Archdiocese of Ranchi
Diocese of Daltonganj
Diocese of Dumka
Diocese of Gumla
Diocese of Hazaribag
Diocese of Jamshedpur
Diocese of Khunti
Diocese of Port Blair, on the Andaman and Nicobar islands
Diocese of Simdega

Ecclesiastical Province of Shillong (entirely Latin Church)
Metropolitan Archdiocese of Shillong
Diocese of Agartala
Diocese of Aizawl
Diocese of Jowai
Diocese of Nongstoin
Diocese of Tura

Ecclesiastical Province of Thiruvananthapuram (entirely Latin Church)
Metropolitan Archdiocese of Thiruvananthapuram
Diocese of Alleppey
Diocese of Neyyattinkara
Diocese of Punalur
Diocese of Quilon

Ecclesiastical Province of Verapoly (entirely Latin Church)
Metropolitan Archdiocese or Verapoly
Diocese of Calicut
Diocese of Cochin
Diocese of Kannur
Diocese of Kottapuram
Diocese of Sultanpet
Diocese of Vijayapuram

Ecclesiastical Province of Visakhapatnam (entirely Latin Church)
Metropolitan Archdiocese of Visakhapatnam
Diocese of Eluru
Diocese of Guntur
Diocese of Nellore
Diocese of Srikakulam
Diocese of Vijayawada

Syro-Malabar Catholic Ecclesiastical Province of Eranakulam - Angamaly
 Syro-Malabar Catholic Archeparchy of Eranakulam-Angamaly, the Major Archeparchy, head of the Eastern particular church, and Metropolitan Archeparchy of Eranakulam-Angamaly
 Syro-Malabar Catholic Eparchy of Idukki 
 Syro-Malabar Catholic Eparchy of Kothamangalam

Syro-Malabar Catholic Ecclesiastical Province of Changanassery
 Syro-Malabar Metropolitan Archeparchy of Changanassery
 Syro-Malabar Catholic Eparchy of Kanjirappally
 Syro-Malabar Catholic Eparchy of Palai
 Syro-Malabar Catholic Eparchy of Thuckalay

Syro-Malabar Catholic Archeparchy of Kottayam
 Syro-Malabar Catholic Archeparchy of Kottayam (Archeparchy of Kottayam, nominal Metropolitan, no suffragan)

Syro-Malabar Catholic Ecclesiastical Province of Tellicherry
 Syro-Malabar Metropolitan Archeparchy of Tellicherry
 Syro-Malabar Catholic Eparchy of Belthangady
 Syro-Malabar Catholic Eparchy of Bhadravathi
 Syro-Malabar Catholic Eparchy of Mananthavady
 Syro-Malabar Catholic Eparchy of Mandya
 Syro-Malabar Catholic Eparchy of Thamarassery

Syro-Malabar Catholic Ecclesiastical Province of Thrissur
 Syro-Malabar Metropolitan Archeparchy of Thrissur
 Syro-Malabar Catholic Eparchy of Irinjalakuda
 Syro-Malabar Catholic Eparchy of Palghat
 Syro-Malabar Catholic Eparchy of Ramanathapuram

Ecclesiastical Province of Trivandrum
 Syro-Malankara Catholic Major Archeparchy of Trivandrum, the Major Archbishop, chief of the particular church
 Syro-Malankara Catholic Eparchy of Marthandom 
 Syro-Malankara Catholic Eparchy of Mavelikara 
 Syro-Malankara Catholic Eparchy of Parassala
 Syro-Malankara Catholic Eparchy of Pathanamthitta
 Syro-Malankara Catholic Eparchy of St. Ephrem of Khadki

Ecclesiastical Province of Tiruvalla
 Syro-Malankara Catholic Archeparchy of Tiruvalla 
 Syro-Malankara Catholic Eparchy of Muvattupuzha 
 Syro-Malankara Catholic Eparchy of Bathery 
 Syro-Malankara Catholic Eparchy of Puthur

Episcopal Conference of Indonesia 

Exempt diocese, immediately subject to the Holy See
 Military Ordinariate of Indonesia

Ecclesiastical Province of Jakarta
  Roman Catholic Archdiocese of Jakarta
  Roman Catholic Diocese of Bandung
  Roman Catholic Diocese of Bogor

Ecclesiastical Province of Ende
  Roman Catholic Archdiocese of Ende
  Roman Catholic Diocese of Denpasar
  Roman Catholic Diocese of Larantuka
  Roman Catholic Diocese of Maumere
  Roman Catholic Diocese of Ruteng

Ecclesiastical Province of Kupang
  Roman Catholic Archdiocese of Kupang
  Roman Catholic Diocese of Atambua
  Roman Catholic Diocese of Weetebula

Ecclesiastical Province of Makassar
  Roman Catholic Archdiocese of Makassar
  Roman Catholic Diocese of Amboina
  Roman Catholic Diocese of Manado

Ecclesiastical Province of Medan
  Roman Catholic Archdiocese of Medan
  Roman Catholic Diocese of Padang
  Roman Catholic Diocese of Sibolga

Ecclesiastical Province of Merauke
  Roman Catholic Archdiocese of Merauke
  Roman Catholic Diocese of Agats
  Roman Catholic Diocese of Jayapura
  Roman Catholic Diocese of Manokwari-Sorong
  Roman Catholic Diocese of Timika

Ecclesiastical Province of Palembang
  Roman Catholic Archdiocese of Palembang
  Roman Catholic Diocese of Pangkal-Pinang
  Roman Catholic Diocese of Tanjungkarang

Ecclesiastical Province of Pontianak
  Roman Catholic Archdiocese of Pontianak
  Roman Catholic Diocese of Ketapang
  Roman Catholic Diocese of Sanggau
  Roman Catholic Diocese of Sintang

Ecclesiastical Province of Samarinda
  Roman Catholic Archdiocese of Samarinda
  Roman Catholic Diocese of Banjarmasin
  Roman Catholic Diocese of Palangkaraya
  Roman Catholic Diocese of Tanjung Selor

Ecclesiastical Province of Semarang
  Roman Catholic Archdiocese of Semarang
  Roman Catholic Diocese of Malang
  Roman Catholic Diocese of Purwokerto
  Roman Catholic Diocese of Surabaya

Episcopal Conference of Laos and Cambodia 

three exempt missionary dioceses in Cambodia, no ecclesiastical province but directly subject to Rome
 Apostolic Vicariate of Phnom Penh
 Apostolic Prefecture of Battambang
 Apostolic Prefecture of Kompong Cham

four exempt missionary dioceses in Laos, no ecclesiastical province but directly subject to Rome
 Apostolic Vicariate of Luang Prabang
 Apostolic Vicariate of Pakse
 Apostolic Vicariate of Savannakhet
 Apostolic Vicariate of Vientiane

Episcopal Conference of Malaysia, Singapore and Brunei 

Exempt (arch)dioceses in Brunei and Singapore (no provinces nor national episcopal conferences, immediately subject to Rome)
 Archdiocese of Singapore, covering Singapore
 Apostolic Vicariate of Brunei Darussalam, covering Brunei (on Borneo)

Ecclesiastical Province of Kuala Lumpur, in Peninsular Malaysia (Malaya)
 Metropolitan Archdiocese of Kuala Lumpur
 Diocese of Melaka-Johor
 Diocese of Penang

Ecclesiastical Province of Kuching, in Sarawak state, on Borneo
 Metropolitan Archdiocese of Kuching
 Diocese of Miri
 Diocese of Sibu

Ecclesiastical Province of Kota Kinabalu, in Sabah state, on Borneo
 Metropolitan Archdiocese of Kota Kinabalu
 Diocese of Keningau
 Diocese of Sandakan

Episcopal Conference of Pakistan 

Pakistan Catholic Bishops’ Conference (P.C.B.C.)

Exempt, directly subject to the Holy See
 Apostolic Vicariate of Quetta, in Balochistan province

Ecclesiastical Province of Karachi, in Sindh province
 Metropolitan Archdiocese of Karachi, in Sindh
 Diocese of Hyderabad, in Sindh

Ecclesiastical Province of Lahore, in Punjab province
 Metropolitan Archdiocese of Lahore, in Punjab
 Diocese of Rawalpindi, in Punjab
 Diocese of Multan, in Punjab
 Diocese of Faisalabad, in Punjab

Episcopal Conference of the Philippines

Exempt dioceses, immediately subject to the Holy See
 Military Ordinariate of the Philippines
 seven Apostolic Vicariates
Apostolic Vicariate of Bontoc-Lagawe
Apostolic Vicariate of Calapan
Apostolic Vicariate of Jolo
Apostolic Vicariate of Puerto Princesa
Apostolic Vicariate of San Jose in Mindoro
Apostolic Vicariate of Tabuk
Apostolic Vicariate of Taytay

Ecclesiastical Province of Caceres
Metropolitan Archdiocese of Caceres
Diocese of Daet
Diocese of Legazpi
Diocese of Libmanan
Diocese of Masbate
Diocese of Sorsogon
Diocese of Virac

Ecclesiastical Province of Cagayan de Oro
Metropolitan Archdiocese of Cagayan de Oro
Diocese of Butuan
Diocese of Malaybalay
Diocese of Surigao
Diocese of Tandag

Ecclesiastical Province of Capiz
Metropolitan Archdiocese of Capiz
Diocese of Kalibo
Diocese of Romblon

Ecclesiastical Province of Cebu
Metropolitan Archdiocese of Cebu
Diocese of Dumaguete
Diocese of Maasin
Diocese of Tagbilaran
Diocese of Talibon

Ecclesiastical Province of Cotabato
Metropolitan Archdiocese of Cotabato
Diocese of Kidapawan
Diocese of Marbel

Ecclesiastical Province of Davao
Metropolitan Archdiocese of Davao
Diocese of Digos
Diocese of Mati
Diocese of Tagum

Ecclesiastical Province of Jaro
Metropolitan Archdiocese of Jaro
Diocese of Bacolod
Diocese of Kabankalan
Diocese of San Carlos
Diocese of San Jose de Antique

Ecclesiastical Province of Lingayen-Dagupan
Metropolitan Archdiocese of Lingayen-Dagupan
Diocese of Alaminos
Diocese of Cabanatuan
Diocese of San Fernando de La Union
Diocese of San Jose in Nueva Ecija
Diocese of Urdaneta

Ecclesiastical Province of Lipa
Metropolitan Archdiocese of Lipa
Diocese of Boac
Diocese of Gumaca
Diocese of Lucena
Territorial Prelature of Infanta

Ecclesiastical Province of Manila
Metropolitan Archdiocese of Manila
Diocese of Antipolo
Diocese of Cubao
Diocese of Imus
Diocese of Kalookan
Diocese of Malolos
Diocese of Novaliches
Diocese of Parañaque
Diocese of Pasig
Diocese of San Pablo

Ecclesiastical Province of Nueva Segovia
Metropolitan Archdiocese of Nueva Segovia
Diocese of Baguio
Diocese of Bangued
Diocese of Laoag

Ecclesiastical Province of Ozamis
Metropolitan Archdiocese of Ozamis
Diocese of Dipolog
Diocese of Iligan
Diocese of Pagadian
Territorial Prelature of Marawi

Ecclesiastical Province of Palo
Metropolitan Archdiocese of Palo
Diocese of Borongan
Diocese of Calbayog
Diocese of Catarman
Diocese of Naval

Ecclesiastical Province of San Fernando
Metropolitan Archdiocese of San Fernando
Diocese of Balanga
Diocese of Iba
Diocese of Tarlac

Ecclesiastical Province of Tuguegarao
Metropolitan Archdiocese of Tuguegarao
Diocese of Bayombong
Diocese of Ilagan
Territorial Prelature of Batanes

Ecclesiastical Province of Zamboanga
Metropolitan Archdiocese of Zamboanga
Roman Catholic Diocese of Ipil
Territorial Prelature of Isabela

Episcopal Conference of Sri Lanka, including the Maldives 

Ecclesiastical Province of Colombo
 Metropolitan Archdiocese of Colombo, including all the Maldives
Diocese of Anuradhapura
Diocese of Badulla
Diocese of Batticaloa
Diocese of Chilaw
Diocese of Galle
Diocese of Jaffna
Diocese of Kandy
Diocese of Kurunegala
Diocese of Mannar
Diocese of Ratnapura
Diocese of Trincomalee

Episcopal Conference of Thailand 

Ecclesiastical Province of Bangkok
Metropolitan Archdiocese of Bangkok
Diocese of Chanthaburi
Diocese of Chiang Mai
Diocese of Chiang Rai
Diocese of Nakhon Sawan
Diocese of Ratchaburi
Diocese of Surat Thani

Ecclesiastical Province of Thare and Nonseng
Metropolitan Archdiocese of Thare and Nonseng
Diocese of Nakhon Ratchasima
Diocese of Ubon Ratchathani
Diocese of Udon Thani

Episcopal Conference of Vietnam 

Episcopal Conference of Vietnam (Hội Đông Giám Mục Việt Nam), at Hồ Chí Minh City

Ecclesiastical Province of Hà Nội
Metropolitan Archdiocese of Hà Nội
Diocese of Bắc Ninh
Diocese of Bùi Chu
Diocese of Hải Phòng
Diocese of Hà Tĩnh
Diocese of Hưng Hóa
Diocese of Lạng Sơn and Cao Bằng
Diocese of Phát Diệm
Diocese of Thái Bình
Diocese of Thanh Hóa
Diocese of Vinh

Ecclesiastical Province of Huế
Metropolitan Archdiocese of Huế
Diocese of Ban Mê Thuột
Diocese of Đà Nẵng
Diocese of Kon Tum
Diocese of Nha Trang
Diocese of Quy Nhơn

Ecclesiastical Province of Hồ Chí Minh City
Metropolitan Archdiocese of Hồ Chí Minh City (Thành phố Hồ Chí Minh; formerly Saigon)
Diocese of Bà Rịa
Diocese of Cần Thơ
Diocese of Đà Lạt
Diocese of Long Xuyên
Diocese of Mỹ Tho
Diocese of Phan Thiết
Diocese of Phú Cường
Diocese of Vĩnh Long
Diocese of Xuân Lộc

Exempt without conference 
 Apostolic Prefecture of Ulaanbaatar, in and for all (Outer) Mongolia

Episcopal Conference of Taiwan (officially Chinese Regional Bishops Conference) 

Ecclesiastical Province of Taipei, covering Taiwan
 Metropolitan Archdiocese of Taipei
 Diocese of Hsinchu
 Diocese of Hwalien (Hualien)
 Diocese of Kaohsiung
 Diocese of Kiayi (Chiayi)
 Diocese of Taichung
 Diocese of Tainan
 Apostolic Administration of Kinmen

Episcopal Conference of China (PR, including Hong Kong; not including Taiwan) 

Exempt, each directly subject to the Holy See, mainly missionary Apostolic prefectures; many are truly vacant or under a temporary Apostolic administrator; no Apostolic Vicariates)
 Diocese of Macau
 Apostolic Prefecture of Baoqing (Paoking/ Shaoyang)
 Apostolic Prefecture of Guilin (Kweilin)
 Apostolic Prefecture of Hainan
 Apostolic Administration of Harbin
 Apostolic Prefecture of Haizhou (Donghai/ Haichow)
 Apostolic Prefecture of Jiamusi (Kiamusze)
 Apostolic Prefecture of Jian’ou (Jianning/ Kienning/ Kienow)
 Apostolic Prefecture of Lindong (Lintung)
 Apostolic Prefecture of Linqing (Lintsing)
 Apostolic Prefecture of Lixian (Lizhou/ Lichow)
 Apostolic Prefecture of Qiqihar (Tsitsikar)
 Apostolic Prefecture of Shaowu
 Apostolic Prefecture of Shashi (Shasi)
 Apostolic Prefecture of Shiqian (Shihtsien)
 Apostolic Prefecture of Suixian (Suihsien)
 Apostolic Prefecture of Tongzhou (Tungchow)
 Apostolic Prefecture of Tunxi (Tunki)
 Apostolic Prefecture of Weihai (Weihaiwei)
 Apostolic Prefecture of Xiangtan (Siangtan)
 Apostolic Prefecture of Xing’anfu (Ankang/ Hinganfu)
 Apostolic Prefecture of Xining (Sining)
 Apostolic Prefecture of Xinjiang (Jiangzhou/ Kiangchow)
 Apostolic Prefecture of Xinjiang-Urumqi (Urumqi/ Sinkiang/ Xinjiang)
 Apostolic Prefecture of Xinxiang (Sinsiang)
 Apostolic Prefecture of Yangzhou (Yangchow)
 Apostolic Prefecture of Yiduxian (Iduhsien)
 Apostolic Prefecture of Yixian (Yihsien)
 Apostolic Prefecture of Yongzhou (Lingling/ Yungchow)
 Apostolic Prefecture of Yueyang (Yuezhou/ Yochow)
 Apostolic Prefecture of Zhaotong (Chaotung)
 Russian Catholic Apostolic Exarchate of Harbin (Byzantine Rite), with former cathedral see in Harbin

Ecclesiastical Province of Anking
 Metropolitan Archdiocese of Anqing 安慶 / Huaining 懷寧 / Huai-ning / Anking
Diocese of Bengbu 蚌埠
Diocese of Wuhu 蕪湖

Ecclesiastical Province of Peking
 Metropolitan Archdiocese of Beijing 北京 / Peking
Diocese of Anguo 安國
Diocese of Baoding 保定
Diocese of Chengde 承德
Diocese of Daming 大名
Diocese of Jingxian 景縣
Diocese of Shunde 順得
Diocese of Tianjin 天津
Diocese of Xianxian 獻縣
Diocese of Xuanhua 宣化
Diocese of Yongnian 永年
Diocese of Yongping 永平
Diocese of Zhaoxian 趙縣
Diocese of Zhengding 正定

Ecclesiastical Province of Changsha
Metropolitan Archdiocese of Changsha 長沙/ Changsha
Diocese of Changde 常德
Diocese of Hengzhou 衡州
Diocese of Yuanling 沅陵

Ecclesiastical Province of Chungking
Metropolitan Archdiocese of Chongqing 重慶/ Chungking
Diocese of Chengdu 成都
Diocese of Jiading 嘉定
Diocese of Kangding 康定
Diocese of Ningyuan 寧遠
Diocese of Shunqing 順慶
Diocese of Suifu 敘府
Diocese of Wanxian 萬縣

Ecclesiastical Province of Foochow
Metropolitan Archdiocese of Fuzhou 福州/ Min-Hou/ Minhou 閩侯/ Foochow
Diocese of Funing 福寧
Diocese of Tingzhou 汀州
Diocese of Xiamen 廈門

Ecclesiastical Province of Canton
Metropolitan Archdiocese of Guangzhou 廣州/ Canton
Diocese of Beihai 北海
Diocese of Hong Kong 香港
Diocese of Jiangmen 江門
Diocese of Jiaying 嘉應
Diocese of Shantou 汕頭
Diocese of Shaozhou 韶州

Ecclesiastical Province of Kweyang
Metropolitan Archdiocese of Guiyang 貴陽/ Kweyang
Diocese of Nanlong 南龍

Ecclesiastical Province of Hangchow
Metropolitan Archdiocese of Hangzhou 杭州/ Hangchow
Diocese of Lishui 麗水
Diocese of Ningbo 寧波
Diocese of Taizhou 台州
Diocese of Yongjia 永嘉

Ecclesiastical Province of Hankow
Metropolitan Archdiocese of Hankou 漢口/ Hankow
Diocese of Hanyang 漢陽
Diocese of Laohekou 老河口
Diocese of Puqi 蒲圻
Diocese of Qizhou 蘄州
Diocese of Shinan 施南
Diocese of Wuchang 武昌
Diocese of Xiangyang 襄陽
Diocese of Yichang 宜昌

Ecclesiastical Province of Tsinan
Metropolitan Archdiocese of Jinan 濟南/ Tsinan
Diocese of Caozhou 曹州
Diocese of Qingdao 青島
Diocese of Yanggu 陽穀
Diocese of Yantai 煙台
Diocese of Yanzhou 兖州
Diocese of Yizhou 沂州
Diocese of Zhoucun 周村

Ecclesiastical Province of Kaifeng
Metropolitan Archdiocese of Kaifeng 開封/ Kaifeng
Diocese of Guide 歸德
Diocese of Luoyang 洛陽
Diocese of Nanyang 南陽
Diocese of Weihui 衛輝
Diocese of Xinyang 信陽
Diocese of Zhengzhou 鄭州
Diocese of Zhumadian 駐馬店

Ecclesiastical Province of Kunming
Metropolitan Archdiocese of Kunming 昆明/ Kunming
Diocese of Dali 大理

Ecclesiastical Province of Lanchow
Metropolitan Archdiocese of Lanzhou 蘭州/ Kao-Lan/ Gaolan 皋蘭/ Lanchow
Diocese of Pingliang 平涼
Diocese of Qinzhou 秦州

Ecclesiastical Province of Nanchang
Metropolitan Archdiocese of Nanchang 南昌/ Nanchang
Diocese of Ganzhou 贛州
Diocese of Ji’an 吉安
Diocese of Nancheng 南城
Diocese of Yujiang 餘江

Ecclesiastical Province of Nanking
Metropolitan Archdiocese of Nanjing 南京/ Nanking
Diocese of Haimen
Diocese of Shanghai
Diocese of Suzhou
Diocese of Xuzhou

Ecclesiastical Province of Nanning
Metropolitan Archdiocese of Nanning 南寧/ Nanning
Diocese of Wuzhou 梧州

Ecclesiastical Province of Mukden
Metropolitan Archdiocese of Shenyang 瀋陽/ Fengtian 奉天/ Fengtien/ Mukden
Diocese of Chifeng 赤峰
Diocese of Fushun 撫順
Diocese of Jilin 吉林
Diocese of Jehol 熱河
Diocese of Sipingjie 四平街
Diocese of Yanji 延吉
Diocese of Yingkou 營口

Ecclesiastical Province of Hohhot
Metropolitan Archdiocese of Suiyuan 綏遠/ Suiyüan/ Hohhot 呼和浩特
Diocese of Jining 集寧
Diocese of Ningxia 寧夏
Diocese of Xiwanzi 西彎子

Ecclesiastical Province of Taiyuan
Metropolitan Archdiocese of Taiyuan 太原/ Taiyüan
Diocese of Datong 大同
Diocese of Fenyang 汾陽
Diocese of Hongdong 洪洞
Diocese of Lu’an 潞安
Diocese of Shuozhou 朔州
Diocese of Yuci 榆次

Ecclesiastical Province of Sian
Metropolitan Archdiocese of Xi’an 西安 / Chang-An/ Chang’an 長安/ Sian
Diocese of Fengxiang 鳳翔
Diocese of Hanzhong 漢中
Diocese of Sanyuan 三原
Diocese of Yan’an 延安
Diocese of Zhouzhi 盩厔

Episcopal Conference of Japan 

Exempt - the Personal Ordinariate of Our Lady of the Southern Cross (for former Anglicans in Australia and Japan) has its see in Australia.

Ecclesiastical Province of Nagasaki
Metropolitan Archdiocese of Nagasaki 長崎
Diocese of Fukuoka 福岡
Diocese of Kagoshima 鹿児島
Diocese of Naha 那覇
Diocese of Oita 大分

Ecclesiastical Province of Osaka
Metropolitan Archdiocese of Osaka 大阪
Diocese of Hiroshima 広島
Diocese of Kyoto 京都
Diocese of Nagoya 名古屋
Diocese of Takamatsu 高松

Ecclesiastical Province of Tokyo
Metropolitan Archdiocese of Tokyo 東京
Diocese of Niigata 新潟
Diocese of Saitama さいたま
Diocese of Sapporo 札幌
Diocese of Sendai 仙台
Diocese of Yokohama 横浜

Episcopal Conference of Korea (North and South) 

exempt, immediately subject to the Holy See
 Military Ordinariate of South Korea
 Territorial Abbacy of Tŏkwon (alias Tŏkugen abbey, with a cathedral see)

Ecclesiastical Province of Kwanju (Gwangju), in South Korea
 Metropolitan Archdiocese of Kwangju (Gwanju)
Diocese of Cheju (Jeju)
Diocese of Jeonju (Chŏnju)

Ecclesiastical Province of Seoul, including North Korea
 Metropolitan Archdiocese of Seoul (also partially in North Korea)
Diocese of Ch’unch’on (Chuncheon/ Chunchon) (also partially in North Korea)
Diocese of Daejeon (Taejŏn)
Diocese of Hamhung (Hamhŭng) (in North Korea)
Diocese of Incheon (Inch’ŏn)
Diocese of Pyongyang (P’yŏng-yang) (in North Korea)
Diocese of Suwon
Diocese of Uijeongbu (Uijongbu)
Diocese of Wonju

Ecclesiastical Province of Taegu, in South Korea
 Metropolitan Archdiocese of Taegu (Daegu)
Diocese of Andong
Diocese of Cheongju (Ch’ŏngju)
Diocese of Masan
Diocese of Pusan (Busan)

Oceania (Latin and Eastern Churches)

Episcopal Conference of Australia 

Exempt (arch)dioceses (immediately subject to Rome, no province)
 Military Ordinariate of Australia, for the armed forces
 Archdiocese of Hobart, covering Tasmania
 Archdiocese of Canberra and Goulburn, covering the federal district Canberra and adjacent part of New South Wales
 Personal Ordinariate of Our Lady of the Southern Cross, with see in Maylands, Western Australia (for former Anglicans in Australia and Japan)

Ecclesiastical Province of Adelaide
 Metropolitan Archdiocese of Adelaide, in South Australia
 Diocese of Darwin, covering the Northern Territory
 Diocese of Port Pirie, in South Australia

Ecclesiastical Province of Brisbane, covering Queensland
 Metropolitan Archdiocese of Brisbane
 Diocese of Cairns
 Diocese of Rockhampton
 Diocese of Toowoomba
 Diocese of Townsville

Ecclesiastical Province of Melbourne, covering Victoria state
 Metropolitan Archdiocese of Melbourne
 Diocese of Ballarat
 Diocese of Sale
 Diocese of Sandhurst
 Ukrainian Catholic Diocese of Saints Peter and Paul of Melbourne, a Ukrainian Catholic Church Byzantine Rite Eparchy (Diocese), with cathedral see in North Melbourne, in and for all Australia, also covering New Zealand and further Oceania

Ecclesiastical Province of Perth, covering Western Australia
 Metropolitan Archdiocese of Perth, also includes both Australian Indian Ocean Territories: Cocos (Keeling) Islands  and Christmas Island
 Diocese of Broome
 Diocese of Bunbury
 Diocese of Geraldton

Ecclesiastical Province of Sydney, covering most of New South Wales
 Metropolitan Archdiocese of Sydney
 Diocese of Armidale
 Diocese of Bathurst (in Australia)
 Diocese of Broken Bay
 Diocese of Lismore
 Diocese of Maitland-Newcastle
 Diocese of Parramatta
 Diocese of Wagga Wagga
 Diocese of Wilcannia-Forbes
 Diocese of Wollongong

Other Eastern eparchies (dioceses)
Maronite Diocese of Saint Maron of Sydney, with cathedral see in Redfern, New South Wales; immediately subject to the Maronite Patriarch of Antioch (in Lebanon; Antiochian Rite)
Greek-Melkite Diocese of Saint Michael’s of Sydney, with cathedral see in Darlington, New South Wales; also covers New Zealand; immediately subject to the Melkite Patriarch of Antioch (in Syria; a Byzantine Rite)
Chaldean Catholic Diocese of Saint Thomas the Apostle of Sydney, with cathedral see at Bossley Park, New South Wales; also covers New Zealand; immediately subject to the Chaldean Catholic Patriarch of Babylon (in Iraq; Chaldean Rite= Syro-Oriental)
Syro-Malabar Diocese of Saint Thomas the Apostle of Melbourne, with cathedral see in Melbourne, Victoria; immediately subject to the Major Archbishop of Ernakulam–Angamaly (in India; also Syro-Oriental Rite)

Episcopal Conference of New Zealand 

See Australia for the Chaldean Catholic, Melkite and Ukrainian Catholic dioceses competent for both countries, with sees in Sydney, Sydney viz. Melbourne
 cfr. infra Episcopal Conference of the [South] Pacific for three New Zealand island dependencies, notably the diocese of Raratonga (on the Cook Islands, also covering Niue) and the Mission Sui Iuris of Tokelau, both suffragans of the Metropolitan Archbishop of Suva

Exempt, i.e. immediately subject to the Holy See
 Military Ordinariate of New Zealand, for the armed forces

Ecclesiastical Province of Wellington
 Metropolitan Archdiocese of Wellington
 Diocese of Auckland
 Diocese of Christchurch
 Diocese of Dunedin
 Diocese of Hamilton, New Zealand
 Diocese of Palmerston North

Episcopal Conference of the Pacific 

 An exempt diocese, i.e. immediately subject to the Holy See
 Diocese of Tonga, on and for all Tonga
 For the Ukrainian Catholics, see Australia, under Melbourne

Note: The United States Minor Outlying Islands (U.S. Minor Islands)—such as Wake, Midway, and Johnston, which are territories of USA—are administered by the US Military Ordinariate (the Archdiocese for the Military Services of the United States), in Washington, D.C.

Note: The Diocese of Honolulu, on and for Hawaii, is a suffragan diocese in the ecclesiastical province of San Francisco (California, USA)

Ecclesiastical Province of Agaña
 Metropolitan Archdiocese of Agaña, on and for Guam (US unincorporated territory)
 Diocese of Caroline Islands, on the Caroline Islands, for all the Federated States of Micronesia (Micronesia) and Palau
 Diocese of Chalan Kanoa, on the Northern Mariana Islands and for the Commonwealth of the Northern Mariana Islands (U.S. territory)
 Apostolic Prefecture of the Marshall Islands, with see at Majuro, on and for the Marshall Islands (republic)

Ecclesiastical Province of Nouméa
 Metropolitan Archdiocese of Nouméa (New Caledonia, French special collectivity)
 Diocese of Port-Vila, on and for Vanuatu, former New Hebrides
 Diocese of Wallis et Futuna, with see at Mata-Utu, on and for Wallis et Futuna (French overseas collectivity)

Ecclesiastical Province of Papeete
This province covers all of French Polynesia (French overseas collectivity) and the Pitcairn Islands (UK). 
 Metropolitan Archdiocese of Papeete
 Diocese of Taiohae o Tefenuaenata

Ecclesiastical Province of Samoa-Apia
 Metropolitan Archdiocese of Samoa-Apia, on and for Samoa
 Diocese of Samoa-Pago Pago, on and for American Samoa (US)
 Mission Sui Iuris of Tokelau, on and for Tokelau (NZ)

Ecclesiastical Province of Suva
 Metropolitan Archdiocese of Suva,  on and for Fiji
 Diocese of Rarotonga, on the Cook Islands, for those and Niue (both New Zealand-associated countries)
 Diocese of Tarawa and Nauru, with see at Tarawa on Kiribati (formerly Gilbert Islands), also for Nauru (republic)
 Mission Sui Iuris of Funafuti, on and for Tuvalu (formerly Ellice Islands)

Episcopal Conference of Papua New Guinea and the Solomon Islands 

Ecclesiastical Province of Madang
Metropolitan Archdiocese of Madang
Diocese of Aitape
Diocese of Lae
Diocese of Vanimo
Diocese of Wewak

Ecclesiastical Province of Mount Hagen
Metropolitan Archdiocese of Mount Hagen
Diocese of Goroka
Diocese of Kundiawa
Diocese of Mendi
Diocese of Wabag

Ecclesiastical Province of Port Moresby
Metropolitan Archdiocese of Port Moresby
Diocese of Alotau-Sideia
Diocese of Bereina
Diocese of Daru-Kiunga
Diocese of Kerema

Ecclesiastical Province of Rabaul
Metropolitan Archdiocese of Rabaul
Diocese of Bougainville
Diocese of Kavieng
Diocese of Kimbe

Ecclesiastical Province of Honaira, covering the Solomon Islands
Metropolitan Archdiocese of Honiara
Diocese of Auki
Diocese of Gizo

Africa (Latin and Eastern Churches) 
Symposium of Episcopal Conferences of Africa and Madagascar (S.E.C.A.M.)

Most national churches are also part of an episcopal conference and a regional (subcontinental) group of those, so we list them geographically:

Assembly of Catholic Ordinaries of Egypt 

 Latin Church

 Apostolic Vicariate of Alexandria of Egypt

 Alexandrian Rite (Coptic originally means Egyptian)
 Coptic Catholic Patriarchate of Alexandria, actually in Cairo, Metropolitan Archbishop of the church's only ecclesiastical province sui juris covering Egypt (which has no other Catholic province), with these suffragan Eparchies: 
Coptic Catholic Eparchy of Abu Qirqas
 Coptic Catholic Eparchy of Alexandria
 Coptic Catholic Eparchy of Assiut
 Coptic Catholic Eparchy of Guizeh
 Coptic Catholic Eparchy of Ismayliah
 Coptic Catholic Eparchy of Luqsor
 Coptic Catholic Eparchy of Minya
 Coptic Catholic Eparchy of Sohag

 Byzantine Rite
 Melkite Catholic Territory Dependent on the Patriarch of Egypt, Sudan and South Sudan

 Antiochian Rite 
 Syriac Catholic Eparchy of Cairo

 Armenian Rite
 Armenian Catholic Eparchy of Alexandria (Iskanderiya, a suffragan of the Patriarch of Cilicia), also for Sudan

 Syro-Oriental Rite
 Chaldean Catholic Eparchy of Cairo

Mostly exempt dioceses, directly subject to the Holy See
 Diocese of Laghouat, in Algeria
 in Morocco:

 Archdiocese of Rabat (in Morocco)
 Archdiocese of Tanger (in Morocco)
 For Spanish enclave Ceuta, see Cadiz and Ceuta in Spain (Europe)
 Apostolic Prefecture of Western Sahara, for all Western Sahara
 in Libya:

 Apostolic Vicariate of Benghazi
 Apostolic Vicariate of Derna
 Apostolic Vicariate of Tripoli
 Apostolic Prefecture of Misurata
 Archdiocese of Tunis, for all Tunisia

Ecclesiastical Province of Alger, covering most of Algeria

 Metropolitan Archdiocese of Alger
 Diocese of Constantine
 Diocese of Oran

Regional Episcopal Conference of West Africa (R.E.C.O.W.A.)

The West African subcontinent was previously covered by two language-distinct super-conferences:

Episcopal Conference of Nigeria 

Exempt dioceses, immediately subject to the Holy See
 Maronite Catholic Eparchy of Annunciation of Ibadan (an Antiochian Rite particular church) for the Western and Central African states, with cathedral see Church of Our Lady of the Annunciation, in Ibadan, Oyo State; also Apostolic Visitor in Southern Africa of the Maronites

Ecclesiastical Province of Abuja
Metropolitan Archdiocese of Abuja
Diocese of Gboko
Diocese of Idah
Diocese of Katsina-Ala
Diocese of Lafia
Diocese of Lokoja
Diocese of Makurdi
Diocese of Otukpo

Ecclesiastical Province of Benin City
Metropolitan Archdiocese of Benin City
Diocese of Auchi
Diocese of Bomadi
Diocese of Issele-Uku
Diocese of Uromi
Diocese of Warri

Ecclesiastical Province of Calabar
Metropolitan Archdiocese of Calabar
Diocese of Ikot Ekpene
Diocese of Ogoja
Diocese of Port Harcourt
Diocese of Uyo

Ecclesiastical Province of Ibadan
Metropolitan Archdiocese of Ibadan
Diocese of Ekiti
Diocese of Ilorin
Diocese of Ondo
Diocese of Osogbo
Diocese of Oyo

Ecclesiastical Province of Jos
Metropolitan Archdiocese of Jos
Diocese of Bauchi
Diocese of Jalingo
Diocese of Maiduguri
Diocese of Pankshin
Diocese of Shendam
Diocese of Yola

Ecclesiastical Province of Kaduna
 Metropolitan Archdiocese of Kaduna
Diocese of Kafanchan
Diocese of Kano
Diocese of Kontagora
Diocese of Minna
Diocese of Sokoto
Diocese of Zaria

Ecclesiastical Province of Lagos
 Metropolitan Archdiocese of Lagos
Diocese of Abeokuta
Diocese of Ijebu-Ode

Ecclesiastical Province of Onitsha
 Metropolitan Archdiocese of Onitsha
Diocese of Abakaliki
Diocese of Awgu
Diocese of Awka
Diocese of Ekwulobia
Diocese of Enugu
Diocese of Nnewi
Diocese of Nsukka

Ecclesiastical Province of Owerri
 Metropolitan Archdiocese of Owerri
Diocese of Aba
Diocese of Ahiara
Diocese of Okigwe
Diocese of Orlu
Diocese of Umuahia

Episcopal Conference of Gambia and Sierra Leone 

Exempt, immediately subject to the Holy See
 Diocese of Banjul, in and for all the Gambia

Ecclesiastical Province of Freetown, covering Sierra Leone
 Metropolitan Archdiocese of Freetown
Diocese of Bo
Diocese of Kenema
Diocese of Makeni

Episcopal Conference of Ghana 

Exempt, i.e. directly subject to the Holy See
 Apostolic Vicariate of Donkorkrom

Ecclesiastical Province of Accra
 Metropolitan Archdiocese of Accra
Diocese of Ho
Diocese of Jasikan
Diocese of Keta-Akatsi
Diocese of Koforidua

Ecclesiastical Province of Cape Coast
 Metropolitan Archdiocese of Cape Coast
Diocese of Sekondi-Takoradi
Diocese of Wiawso

Ecclesiastical Province of Kumasi
 Metropolitan Archdiocese of Kumasi
Diocese of Goaso
Diocese of Konongo-Mampong
Diocese of Obuasi
Diocese of Sunyani
Diocese of Techiman

Ecclesiastical Province of Tamale
 Metropolitan Archdiocese of Tamale
Diocese of Damongo
Diocese of Navrongo-Bolgatanga
Diocese of Wa
Diocese of Yendi

Episcopal Conference of Liberia 

Ecclesiastical Province of Monrovia
 Metropolitan Archdiocese of Monrovia
Diocese of Cape Palmas
Diocese of Gbarnga

Ecclesiastical Conference of Benin 

Ecclesiastical Province of Cotonou
 Metropolitan Archdiocese of Cotonou
Diocese of Abomey
Diocese of Dassa-Zoumé
Diocese of Lokossa
Diocese of Porto Novo

Ecclesiastical Province of Parakou
 Metropolitan Archdiocese of Parakou
Diocese of Djougou
Diocese of Kandi
Diocese of Natitingou
Diocese of N’Dali

Ecclesiastical Conference of Burkina Faso and Niger 

Ecclesiastical Province of Bobo-Dioulasso, in Burkina Faso
 Metropolitan Archdiocese of Bobo-Dioulasso
Diocese of Banfora
Diocese of Dédougou
Diocese of Diébougou
Diocese of Gaoua
Diocese of Nouna

Ecclesiastical Province of Koupéla, in Burkina Faso
 Metropolitan Archdiocese of Koupéla
Diocese of Dori
Diocese of Fada N’Gourma
Diocese of Kaya
Diocese of Tenkodogo

Ecclesiastical Province of Ouagadougou, in Burkina Faso
 Metropolitan Archdiocese of Ouagadougou
Diocese of Koudougou
Diocese of Manga
Diocese of Ouahigouya

Ecclesiastical Province of Niamey, covering Niger
 Metropolitan Archdiocese of Niamey
Diocese of Maradi

Episcopal Conference of Côte d'Ivoire (Ivory Coast) 

Ecclesiastical Province of Abidjan
Metropolitan Archdiocese of Abidjan
Diocese of Agboville
Diocese of Grand-Bassam
Diocese of Yopougon

Ecclesiastical Province of Bouaké
Metropolitan Archdiocese of Bouaké
Diocese of Abengourou
Diocese of Bondoukou
Diocese of Yamoussoukro

Ecclesiastical Province of Gagnoa
Metropolitan Archdiocese of Gagnoa
Diocese of Daloa
Diocese of Man
Diocese of San Pedro-en-Côte d'Ivoire

Ecclesiastical Province of Korhogo
Metropolitan Archdiocese of Korhogo
Diocese of Katiola
Diocese of Odienné

Episcopal Conference of Guinea 

Ecclesiastical Province of Conakry, covering Guinea
Metropolitan Archdiocese of Conakry
Diocese of Kankan
Diocese of N’Zérékoré

Episcopal Conference of Mali 

Ecclesiastical Province of Bamako, covering Mali
Metropolitan Archdiocese of Bamako
Diocese of Kayes
Diocese of Mopti
Diocese of San
Diocese of Ségou
Diocese of Sikasso

Episcopal Conference of Togo 

Ecclesiastical Province of Lomé, covering Togo
Metropolitan Archdiocese of Lomé
Diocese of Aného
Diocese of Atakpamé
Diocese of Dapaong
Diocese of Kara
Diocese of Kpalimé
Diocese of Sokodé

Episcopal Conference of Senegal, Cape Verde, Mauritania and Guinée-Bissau 

Ecclesiastical Province of Dakar, covering Senegal
Metropolitan Archdiocese of Dakar
Diocese of Kaolack
Diocese of Kolda
Diocese of Saint-Louis du Sénégal
Diocese of Tambacounda
Diocese of Thiès
Diocese of Ziguinchor

 neither of the above West African super-conferences however covered the dioceses, all directly subject to the Holy See, in three countries formerly under Portuguese or (Franco-)Spanish colonial administration, now participating in the same ecclesiastical conference as ex-French Senegal
 one exempt dioceses, covering Mauritania:
 Diocese of Nouakchott
 two exempt dioceses, covering Cape Verde:
 Diocese of Santiago de Cabo Verde
 Diocese of Mindelo
 two exempt dioceses, covering Guinea-Bissau:
 Diocese of Bissau
 Diocese of Bafatá

 two exempt members (no ecclesiastical province, directly subject to the Holy See) of the Episcopal conference of the Arab region Latin bishops, see Asia:
 Diocese of Djibouti, for all Djibouti
 Diocese of Mogadiscio, for all Somalia

Episcopal Conference of Ethiopia and Eritrea 

Neither country has or is part of any Latin Church province.

Eritrea has no Latin hierarchy, even the post of Apostolic nuncio is held by the nuncio to Sudan in Khartoum.

Ethiopia has the following exempt apostolic vicariates and apostolic prefecture, each immediately subject to the Holy See
 Apostolic Vicariate of Awasa
 Apostolic Vicariate of Gambella
 Apostolic Vicariate of Harar
 Apostolic Vicariate of Hosanna
 Apostolic Vicariate of Jimma-Bonga, at Jimma
 Apostolic Vicariate of Meki
 Apostolic Vicariate of Nekemte
 Apostolic Vicariate of Soddo
 Apostolic Prefecture of Robe

Eastern Alexandrian rite particular churches (Metropolitanates sui juris) 
However, each country has an Alexandrian rite (like the Egyptian Copts, but in Geez language) Metropolitan particular church 'sui iuris', whose episcopates fully parttake in the joint Episcopal Conference, yet also has its own council of bishops
Ecclesiastical Province of Addis Abeba (Ethiopia, sui iuris)
Ethiopian Catholic Archeparchy of Addis Abeba, the Metropolitan Archdiocese, with three suffragans Eparchies (dioceses)
Ethiopian Catholic Eparchy of Adigrat
Ethiopian Catholic Eparchy of Bahir Dar–Dessie
Ethiopian Catholic Eparchy of Emdeber

Ecclesiastical Province of Asmara (Eritrea, sui iuris)
Eritrean Catholic Archeparchy of Asmara, the Metropolitan Archdiocese, with three suffragans Eparchies (dioceses)
 Eritrean Catholic Eparchy of Barentu
 Eritrean Catholic Eparchy of Keren
 Eritrean Catholic Eparchy of Segheneyti

Episcopal Conference of Kenya 

Exempt, i.e. directly subject to the Holy See
 Military Ordinariate of Kenya
 Apostolic Vicariate of Isiolo

Ecclesiastical Province of Kisumu
 Metropolitan Archdiocese of Kisumu
Diocese of Bungoma
Diocese of Eldoret
Diocese of Homa Bay
Diocese of Kakamega
Diocese of Kisii
Diocese of Kitale
Diocese of Lodwar

Ecclesiastical Province of Mombasa
 Metropolitan Archdiocese of Mombasa
Diocese of Garissa
Diocese of Malindi

Ecclesiastical Province of Nairobi
 Metropolitan Archdiocese of Nairobi
Diocese of Kericho
Diocese of Kitui
Diocese of Machakos
Diocese of Nakuru
Diocese of Ngong

Ecclesiastical Province of Nyeri
 Metropolitan Archdiocese of Nyeri
Diocese of Embu
Diocese of Maralal
Diocese of Marsabit
Diocese of Meru
Diocese of Muranga
Diocese of Nyahururu

Episcopal Conference of Malawi 

Ecclesiastical Province of Blantyre
 Metropolitan Archdiocese of Blantyre
Diocese of Chikwawa
Diocese of Mangochi
Diocese of Zomba

Ecclesiastical Province of Lilongwe
 Metropolitan Archdiocese of Lilongwe
Diocese of Dedza
Diocese of Karonga
Diocese of Mzuzu

Episcopal Conference of Sudan & South Sudan 

Ecclesiastical Province of Juba, covering the Latin Church in South Sudan
 Metropolitan Archdiocese of Juba
Diocese of Malakal
Diocese of Rumbek
Diocese of Tombura-Yambio
Diocese of Torit
Diocese of Wau
Diocese of Yei

Ecclesiastical Province of Khartoum, covering the Latin Church in Sudan
 Metropolitan Archdiocese of Khartoum
Diocese of El Obeid

Eastern church jurisdictions, covering both countries
Melkite Territory Dependent on the Patriarch of Egypt, Sudan and South Sudan (Greek-language Byzantine Rite), with cathedrals in Cairo and Alexandria
Syriac Territory Dependent on the Patriarch of Sudan and South Sudan (Antiochian rite; no see here, but vested in the Syriac bishop of Cairo (in Egypt, immediately subject to the Patriarch of Antioch)
 For the Armenian Catholics in Sudan, see Egypt Armenian Catholic Eparchy of Iskanderiya (Alexandria, a suffragan of the Patriarch of Cilicia)

Episcopal Conference of Tanzania

Ecclesiastical Province of Arusha
Archdiocese of Arusha
Diocese of Mbulu
Diocese of Moshi
Diocese of Same

Ecclesiastical Province of Dar-es-Salaam
Archdiocese of Dar-es-Salaam
Diocese of Ifakara
Diocese of Mahenge
Diocese of Morogoro
Diocese of Tanga
Diocese of Zanzibar

Ecclesiastical Province of Dodoma
Archdiocese of Dodoma
Diocese of Kondoa
Diocese of Singida

Ecclesiastical Province of Mbeya
Archdiocese of Mbeya
Diocese of Iringa
Diocese of Sumbawanga

Ecclesiastical Province of Mwanza
Archdiocese of Mwanza
Diocese of Bukoba
Diocese of Bunda
Diocese of Geita
Diocese of Kayanga
Diocese of Musoma
Diocese of Rulenge–Ngara
Diocese of Shinyanga

Ecclesiastical Province of Songea
Archdiocese of Songea
Diocese of Lindi
Diocese of Mbinga
Diocese of Mtwara
Diocese of Njombe
Diocese of Tunduru-Masasi

Ecclesiastical Province of Tabora
Archdiocese of Tabora
Diocese of Kahama
Diocese of Kigoma
Diocese of Mpanda

Episcopal Conference of Uganda 

Exempt diocese, immediately subject to the Holy See
 Military Ordinariate of Uganda

Ecclesiastical Province of Gulu
Metropolitan Archdiocese of Gulu
Diocese of Arua
Diocese of Lira
Diocese of Nebbi

Ecclesiastical Province of Kampala
 Metropolitan Archdiocese of Kampala
Diocese of Kasana–Luweero
Diocese of Kiyinda–Mityana
Diocese of Lugazi
Diocese of Masaka

Ecclesiastical Province of Mbarara
 Metropolitan Archdiocese of Mbarara
Diocese of Fort Portal
Diocese of Hoima
Diocese of Kabale
Diocese of Kasese

Ecclesiastical Province of Tororo
 Metropolitan Archdiocese of Tororo
Diocese of Jinja
Diocese of Kotido
Diocese of Moroto
Diocese of Soroti

Episcopal Conference of Zambia 

Ecclesiastical Province of Kasama
Metropolitan Archdiocese of Kasama
Diocese of Mansa
Diocese of Mpika

Ecclesiastical Province of Lusaka
Metropolitan Archdiocese of Lusaka
Diocese of Chipata
Diocese of Kabwe
Diocese of Livingstone
Diocese of Mongu
Diocese of Monze
Diocese of Ndola
Diocese of Solwezi

(?only Latin dioceses)
This subcontinent is still covered by two distinct super-conferences:
 Association of Episcopal Conferences of Central Africa, covering the three countries formerly under Belgian colonial administration: Congo, Burundi and Rwanda

Ecclesiastical Conference of Burundi 

Ecclesiastical Province of Bujumbura
Metropolitan Archdiocese of Bujumbura
Diocese of Bubanza
Diocese of Bururi

Ecclesiastical Province of Gitega
Metropolitan Archdiocese of Gitega
Diocese of Muyinga
Diocese of Ngozi
Diocese of Rutana
Diocese of Ruyigi

Episcopal Conference of the Congo (-Kinshasa, Democratic Republic of the Congo, ex-Zaire) 

Ecclesiastical Province of Bukavu
Metropolitan Archdiocese of Bukavu
Diocese of Butembo-Beni
Diocese of Goma
Diocese of Kasongo
Diocese of Kindu
Diocese of Uvira

Ecclesiastical Province of Kananga
Metropolitan Archdiocese of Kananga
Diocese of Kabinda
Diocese of Kole
Diocese of Luebo
Diocese of Luiza
Diocese of Mbujimayi
Diocese of Mweka
Diocese of Tshumbe

Ecclesiastical Province of Kinshasa
Metropolitan Archdiocese of Kinshasa
Diocese of Boma
Diocese of Idiofa
Diocese of Inongo
Diocese of Kenge
Diocese of Kikwit
Diocese of Kisantu
Diocese of Matadi
Diocese of Popokabaka

Ecclesiastical Province of Kisangani
Metropolitan Archdiocese of Kisangani
Diocese of Bondo
Diocese of Bunia
Diocese of Buta
Diocese of Doruma-Dungu
Diocese of Isangi
Diocese of Isiro-Niangara
Diocese of Mahagi-Nioka
Diocese of Wamba

Ecclesiastical Province of Lubumbashi
Metropolitan Archdiocese of Lubumbashi
Diocese of Kalemie-Kirungu
Diocese of Kamina
Diocese of Kilwa-Kasenga
Diocese of Kolwezi
Diocese of Kongolo
Diocese of Manono
Diocese of Sakania-Kipushi

Ecclesiastical Province of Mbandaka-Bikoro
Metropolitan Archdiocese of Mbandaka-Bikoro
Diocese of Basankusu
Diocese of Bokungu-Ikela
Diocese of Budjala
Diocese of Lisala
Diocese of Lolo
Diocese of Molegbe

Episcopal Conference of Rwanda 

Ecclesiastical Province of Kigali, covering Rwanda
Metropolitan Archdiocese of Kigali
Diocese of Butare
Diocese of Byumba
Diocese of Cyangugu
Diocese of Gikongoro
Diocese of Kabgayi
Diocese of Kibungo
Diocese of Nyundo
Diocese of Ruhengeri
 Association of Episcopal Conferences of the Central Africa Region, covering countries formerly under French or Spanish colonial administration

Ecclesiastical Conference of Cameroon 

Ecclesiastical Province of Bamenda
Metropolitan Archdiocese of Bamenda
Diocese of Buéa
Diocese of Kumba
Diocese of Kumbo
Diocese of Mamfe

Ecclesiastical Province of Bertoua
Metropolitan Archdiocese of Bertoua
Diocese of Batouri
Diocese of Doumé–Abong’ Mbang
Diocese of Yokadouma

Ecclesiastical Province of Douala
Metropolitan Archdiocese of Douala
Diocese of Bafang
Diocese of Bafoussam
Diocese of Edéa
Diocese of Eséka
Diocese of Nkongsamba

Ecclesiastical Province of Garoua
Metropolitan Archdiocese of Garoua
Diocese of Maroua-Mokolo
Diocese of Ngaoundéré
Diocese of Yagoua

Ecclesiastical Province of Yaoundé
Metropolitan Archdiocese of Yaoundé
Diocese of Bafia
Diocese of Ebolowa
Diocese of Kribi
Diocese of Mbalmayo
Diocese of Obala
Diocese of Sangmélima

Episcopal Conference of the Central African Republic 

Ecclesiastical Province of Bangui, covering the Central African republic
Metropolitan Archdiocese of Bangui
Diocese of Alindao
Diocese of Bambari
Diocese of Bangassou
Diocese of Berbérati
Diocese of Bossangoa
Diocese of Bouar
Diocese of Kaga-Bandoro
Diocese of Mbaïki

Episcopal Conference of Chad 

 Exempt, immediately subject to the Holy See
 Apostolic Vicariate of Mongo

Ecclesiastical Province of N'Djamena
 Metropolitan Archdiocese of N'Djamena
Diocese of Doba
Diocese of Goré
Diocese of Lai
Diocese of Moundou
Diocese of Pala
Diocese of Sarh

Episcopal Conference of the Congo (Brazzaville) 

Ecclesiastical Province of Brazzaville
Metropolitan Archdiocese of Brazzaville
Diocese of Gamboma
Diocese of Kinkala

Ecclesiastical Province of Owando
Metropolitan Archdiocese of Owando
Diocese of Impfondo
Diocese of Ouesso

Ecclesiastical Province of Pointe-Noire
Metropolitan Archdiocese of Pointe-Noire
Diocese of Dolisie
Diocese of Nkayi

Episcopal Conference of Equatorial Guinea 

Ecclesiastical Province of Malabo
 Metropolitan Archdiocese of Malabo
Diocese of Bata
Diocese of Ebebiyin
Diocese of Evinayong
Diocese of Mongomo

Episcopal Conference of Gabon 

Exempt missionary circonscription, directly subject to the Holy See
 Apostolic Vicariate of Makokou

Ecclesiastical Province of Libreville, covering the rest of Gabon
 Metropolitan Archdiocese of Libreville
Diocese of Franceville
Diocese of Mouila
Diocese of Oyem
Diocese of Port-Gentil

Episcopal Conference of Angola and São Tomé e Principe 

Exempt, directly subject to the Holy See
 Diocese of São Tomé and Príncipe

Ecclesiastical Province of Huambo
Metropolitan Archdiocese of Huambo
Diocese of Benguela
Diocese of Kwito-Bié

Ecclesiastical Province of Luanda
Metropolitan Archdiocese of Luanda
Diocese of Cabinda
Diocese of Caxito
Diocese of Mbanza Congo
Diocese of Sumbe
Diocese of Viana

Ecclesiastical Province of Lubango
Metropolitan Archdiocese of Lubango
Diocese of Menongue
Diocese of Namibe
Diocese of Ondjiva

Ecclesiastical Province of Malanje
Metropolitan Archdiocese of Malanje
Diocese of Ndalatando
Diocese of Uije

Ecclesiastical Province of Saurímo
Metropolitan Archdiocese of Saurímo
Diocese of Dundo
Diocese of Lwena

Episcopal Conference of the Indian Ocean (minor African East coast island states) 

 Only exempt dioceses, each for a whole country (or two) without national conference, directly subject to the Holy See

 in Mauritius :
 Diocese of Port-Louis on Mauritius (also covers the British Indian Ocean Territory)
 Apostolic Vicariate of Rodrigues, covering part of Mauritius
 Diocese of Port Victoria o Seychelles, for the Seychelles
 Diocese of Saint-Denis-de-La Réunion, for the French territory Réunion
 Apostolic Vicariate of Archipel des Comores for the Comoros and Mayotte

Episcopal Conference of Lesotho 

Ecclesiastical Province of Maseru
Metropolitan Archdiocese of Maseru
Diocese of Leribe
Diocese of Mohale's Hoek
Diocese of Qacha's Nek

Episcopal Conference of Madagascar 

Ecclesiastical Province of Antananarivo
 Metropolitan Archdiocese of Antananarivo
Diocese of Antsirabe
Diocese of Maintirano
Diocese of Miarinarivo
Diocese of Tsiroanomandidy

Ecclesiastical Province of Antsiranana
 Metropolitan Archdiocese of Antsiranana
Diocese of Ambanja
Diocese of Mahajanga
Diocese of Port-Bergé

Ecclesiastical Province of Toamasina
 Metropolitan Archdiocese of Toamasina
Diocese of Ambatondrazaka
Diocese of Fenoarivo Atsinanana
Diocese of Moramanga

Ecclesiastical Province of Fianarantsoa
 Metropolitan Archdiocese of Fianarantsoa
Diocese of Ambositra
Diocese of Farafangana
Diocese of Ihosy
Diocese of Mananjary

Ecclesiastical Province of Toliara
 Metropolitan Archdiocese of Toliara
Diocese of Morombe
Diocese of Morondava
Diocese of Tôlagnaro

Episcopal Conference of Mozambique 

Ecclesiastical Province of Beira
Metropolitan Archdiocese of Beira
Diocese of Chimoio
Diocese of Quelimane
Diocese of Tete

Ecclesiastical Province of Maputo
Metropolitan Archdiocese of Maputo
Diocese of Inhambane
Diocese of Xai-Xai

Ecclesiastical Province of Nampula
Metropolitan Archdiocese of Nampula
Diocese of Gurué
Diocese of Lichinga
Diocese of Nacala
Diocese of Pemba

Episcopal Conference of Namibia 

Ecclesiastical Province of Windhoek, covering Namibia
 Metropolitan Archdiocese of Windhoek
 Diocese of Keetmanshoop
 Apostolic Vicariate of Rundu (not exempt)

Episcopal Conference of South Africa, Botswana and Swaziland 

covers the dioceses in the republic of South Africa, and two neighbouring countries whose only dioceses belong to its provinces Botswana and Swaziland
 The wider Inter-Regional Meeting of Bishops of Southern Africa (I.M.B.I.S.A.) also includes Angola and São Tomé and Príncipe, Lesotho, Mozambique, Namibia, Zimbabwe

Exempt, immediately subject to the Holy See
 Military Ordinariate of South Africa
 Apostolic Vicariate of Ingwavuma

Ecclesiastical Province of Bloemfontein
Metropolitan Archdiocese of Bloemfontein
Diocese of Bethlehem
Diocese of Keimoes-Upington
Diocese of Kimberley
Diocese of Kroonstad

Ecclesiastical Province of Cape Town
Metropolitan Archdiocese of Cape Town
Diocese of Aliwal
Diocese of De Aar
Diocese of Oudtshoorn
Diocese of Port Elizabeth
Diocese of Queenstown

Ecclesiastical Province of Durban
Metropolitan Archdiocese of Durban
Diocese of Dundee
Diocese of Eshowe
Diocese of Kokstad
Diocese of Mariannhill
Diocese of Umtata
Diocese of Umzimkulu

Ecclesiastical Province of Johannesburg
Metropolitan Archdiocese of Johannesburg
Diocese of Klerksdorp
Diocese of Witbank
 the province of Johannesburg also includes the only diocesis in Swaziland:
Diocese of Manzini

Ecclesiastical Province of Pretoria
Metropolitan Archdiocese of Pretoria
Diocese of Pietersburg
Diocese of Rustenburg
Diocese of Tzaneen
 the province of Pretoria also includes both dioceses in Botswana:
Diocese of Francistown
Diocese of Gaborone

Episcopal Conference of Zimbabwe 

Ecclesiastical Province of Bulawayo
Metropolitan Archdiocese of Bulawayo
Diocese of Gweru
Diocese of Hwange
Diocese of Masvingo

Ecclesiastical Province of Harare
Metropolitan Archdiocese of Harare
Diocese of Chinhoyi
Diocese of Gokwe
Diocese of Mutare

Eastern Catholic Churches by Rite 
The 23 Eastern Catholic Churches retain many Orthodox traditions, even in the hierarchic terminology, such as calling dioceses Eparchies and archdioceses Archeparchies.

Their respective diocesan structures overlap with and are partially parallel to each other, to the Latin Catholic church and to Orthodox churches, often 'sharing' a see. In addition, exempt, 'mixed' ordinariates for the Eastern churches without dioceses of their own are established in a few (European and Latin American) countries, directly subject to the Holy See.

We present them grouped per ancient rite, or liturgical tradition. Following the name of each Church is given the nature of their ecclesiastical polity; for instance, whether it is headed by a Patriarch, a Major Archbishop, a Metropolitan Archbishop, or has no unified structure and is instead composed of jurisdictions each individually subject to the Holy See.

Exempt, joint ordinariates for all the Eastern faithful 
 Ordinariate for Eastern Catholics in Argentina, for all Eastern Churches, vested in the Latin Church Metropolitan Archbishop of capital Buenos Aires
 Ordinariate for Eastern Catholics in Brazil, for all Eastern Churches, cumulated with varying Latin Church Metropolitan sees
 Ordinariate for Eastern Catholics in France, for all Eastern Churches, vested in the Latin Church Metropolitan Archbishop of capital Paris
 Ordinariate for Eastern Catholics in Poland, for all Eastern Churches, vested in the Latin Church Metropolitan Archbishop of capital Warszaw
 Ordinariate for Eastern Catholics in Spain, for all Eastern Churches, vested in the Latin Church Metropolitan Archbishop of Madrid

Byzantine Rite churches

Exempt, joint Ordinariates or Administrations for the Byzantine Rites faithful 
 Ordinariate for Byzantine-rite Catholics in Austria, vested in the (Latin Church) Metropolitan Archbishop of capital Vienna, for  Byzantine Rite Eastern Catholic churches
 Apostolic Administration of Kazakhstan and Central Asia for Faithful of Byzantine Rite, in Karaganda, for Kazakhstan, Kyrgyzstan, Tajikistan, Turkmenistan and Uzbekistan

(Greek-)Melkite Catholic Church (Patriarchal) 
In the Arab World and Africa, the church has dioceses in:
 Egypt, Sudan and South Sudan:
 Melkite Patriarchal Dependent Territory of Egypt, Sudan, and South Sudan, administered by a Patriarchal Vicar or Protosyncellus, with cathedrals in Cairo (episcopal see) and Alexandria (Ancient Patriarchal see), titular Archeparchy of Alexandria.
 The Holy Land, where the Patriarch of Antioch has the style of Titular Patriarch of Jerusalem:
 Israel: Melkite Greek Catholic Archeparchy of Akka (including Haifa, Nazareth and all Galilee)
 Palestinian territories: Melkite Greek Catholic Archeparchy of Jerusalem of the Melkites (a patriarchal vicariate)
 (Trans)Jordan: Melkite Greek Catholic Archeparchy of Petra and Philadelphia in Amman and all Transjordan
 Iraq:
Melkite Greek Catholic Patriarchal Exarchate of Iraq
 Arabian Peninsula: 
Melkite Greek Catholic Patriarchal Exarchate of Kuwait
 Lebanon:
Melkite Greek Catholic Archeparchy of Baalbek
Melkite Greek Catholic Archeparchy of Baniyas and Marjeyoun (suffragan of Tyre)
Melkite Greek Catholic Archeparchy of Beirut and Byblos (nominally Metropolitan)
Melkite Greek Catholic Archeparchy of Sidon and Deir el-Kamar (suffragan of Tyre)
Melkite Greek Catholic Archeparchy of Tripoli (suffragan of Tyre)
 Metropolitan Melkite Greek Catholic Archeparchy of Tyre (with three Lebanese archiepiscopal suffragans)
Melkite Greek Catholic Archeparchy of Zahle and Forzol and all the Bekaa
 Syria, where the Patriarch of Antioch has the style of Titular Patriarch of Antioch: 
Melkite Greek Catholic Archeparchy of Damascus, Patriarchal See of Antioch.
Melkite Greek Catholic Archeparchy of Aleppo (nominally Metropolitan)
Melkite Greek Catholic Archeparchy of Bosra and Hauran (Archeparchy of  Khabab) (nominally metropolitan)
Melkite Greek Catholic Archeparchy of Homs (united with titular sees Hama and Yabroud) (nominally metropolitan)
Melkite Greek Catholic Archeparchy of Latakia and the Valley of the Christians

Throughout the rest of the world, the Melkite Catholic church has dioceses and exarchates for its diaspora in:
 Australia and New Zealand (Oceania):
 Melkite Greek Catholic Eparchy of Saint Michael Archangel in Sydney
 Turkey (Eurasia):
 Melkite Greek Catholic Patriarchal Exarchate of Istanbul
 North America:
 Melkite Greek Catholic Eparchy of Saint-Sauveur in Montréal (Canada).
 Melkite Greek Catholic Eparchy of Nuestra Señora del Paraíso in Mexico City (Mexico).
 Melkite Greek Catholic Eparchy of Newton (United States of America)
 South America:
 Melkite Greek Catholic Apostolic Exarchate of Argentina
 Melkite Greek Catholic Eparchy of Nossa Senhora do Paraíso em São Paulo ( Brazil, suffragan of the Latin Metropolitan of São Paulo).
 Melkite Greek Catholic Apostolic Exarchate of Venezuela, Caracas.

Furthermore, one of the Ordinaries is appointed Apostolic visitor for the countries without proper ordinariates in Western Europe, while in some countries the Melkite diaspora is served pastorally by an Ordinariate for Eastern Catholic faithful.

Romanian Greek Catholic Church (Major Archiepiscopal) 
 an ecclesiastical province sui juris, covering Romania
 Romanian Catholic Archeparchy of Fagaraș and Alba Iulia, the Major Archbishopric, with cathedral see at Blaj, Alba Julia
Romanian Catholic Eparchy of Oradea Mare
Romanian Catholic Eparchy of Cluj-Gherla
Romanian Catholic Eparchy of Lugos
Romanian Catholic Eparchy of Maramureș
Romanian Catholic Eparchy of Saint Basil the Great of Bucharest

Exempt, i.e. Immediately subject to the Holy See'''
 Romanian Catholic Eparchy of St George's in Canton, bishopric for the diaspora in North America (United States and Canada), with cathedral see in Canton, Ohio (USA)

 Ukrainian Greek Catholic Church (Major Archiepiscopal) 

Exempt, immediately subject to the Holy See
 Ukrainian Catholic Apostolic Exarchate of Germany and Scandinavia, with cathedral see in Munich (Bavaria, Germany), for Germany, Denmark, Finland, Norway and Sweden
 Ukrainian Catholic Apostolic Exarchate of Italy, with cathedral see in Rome

Ukrainian provinces and Metropolitan dependencies
 Ukrainian Catholic Major Archeparchy of Kyiv–Halych, the Major Archiocese and head of the particular church
Ukrainian Catholic Archeparchy of Kyiv, the Metropitan Archeparchy
Ukrainian Catholic Archiepiscopal Exarchate of Crimea (Krym), on the Russian-annexed Crimea, with cathedral see at SimferopolUkrainian Catholic Archiepiscopal Exarchate of Donetsk
Ukrainian Catholic Archiepiscopal Exarchate of Kharkiv
Ukrainian Catholic Archiepiscopal Exarchate of Lutsk
Ukrainian Catholic Archiepiscopal Exarchate of Odessa
 Ukrainian Catholic Archeparchy of Lviv (Metropolitan Archeparchy)
Ukrainian Catholic Eparchy of Stryi
Ukrainian Catholic Eparchy of Sambir – Drohobych
Ukrainian Catholic Eparchy of Sokal – Zhovkva
 Ukrainian Catholic Archeparchy of Ternopil – Zboriv (Metropolitan Archeparchy)
Ukrainian Catholic Eparchy of Buchach
Ukrainian Catholic Eparchy of Kamyanets-Podilskyi
 Ukrainian Catholic Archeparchy of Ivano-Frankivsk (Metropolitan Archeparchy)
Ukrainian Catholic Eparchy of Chernivtsi
Ukrainian Catholic Eparchy of Kolomyia
Polish province
 Ukrainian Catholic Archeparchy of Przemyśl–Warsaw (Metropolitan Archeparchy)
Ukrainian Catholic Eparchy of Olsztyn–Gdańsk
Ukrainian Catholic Eparchy of Wrocław-Koszalin

European dioceses, immediately dependent on the Major Archbishop, not part of his province
 Ukrainian Catholic Eparchy of the Holy Family of London (Ukrainian Catholic Eparchy in Great Britain), with cathedral see in London, for England, Scotland and Wales (in the UK)
 Ukrainian Catholic Eparchy of Saint Vladimir the Great of Paris (Ukrainian Catholic Eparchy in France), with cathedral see in Paris, for France, Belgium, Luxembourg, the Netherlands and Switzerland

Overseas provinces and Metropolitan dependencies
Ukrainian Catholic Archeparchy of Winnipeg, Metropolitan of the province in Canada
Ukrainian Catholic Eparchy of Edmonton
Ukrainian Catholic Eparchy of Toronto and Eastern Canada
Ukrainian Catholic Eparchy of Saskatoon
Ukrainian Catholic Eparchy of New Westminster
Ukrainian Catholic Archeparchy of Philadelphia, Metropolitan of the United States province
Ukrainian Catholic Eparchy of Chicago
Ukrainian Catholic Eparchy of Stamford
Ukrainian Catholic Eparchy of Parma
Ukrainian Catholic Archeparchy of São João Batista em Curitiba, Metropolitan of the Brazilian province
Ukrainian Catholic Eparchy of Imaculada Conceição in PrudentópolisOverseas Eparchies, suffragans of Latin Church Metropolitan Archbishops Ukrainian Catholic Eparchy of Santa María del Patrocinio in Buenos Aires with cathedral see in Buenos Aires, under the otherwise Latin Church ecclesiastical province of Buenos Aires (Argentina) Ukrainian Catholic Eparchy of Saints Peter and Paul of Melbourne with cathedral see in North Melbourne, Victoria, Australia, for Australia, New Zealand and Oceania, under the otherwise Latin Church ecclesiastical province of Melbourne (Australia)

 Hungarian Greek Catholic Church (Metropolitan) 
A single ecclesiastical province sui juris Hungarian Catholic Archeparchy of Hajdúdorog, the Metropolitanate in chief, with two suffragan bishoprics:
 Hungarian Catholic Eparchy of Miskolc
 Hungarian Catholic Eparchy of Nyíregyháza

 Ruthenian Greek Catholic Church (Metropolitan) 
The more general adjective "Byzantine" is often used instead of "Ruthenian" in North America

although its origins are, as the name suggests, in Ruthenia, (now part of Slovakia and Ukraine) its sole exempt diocese, i.e. immediately subject to the Holy See, covers the Czech Republic while all other dioceses depend from the US-based Metropolitan head of the church
 Ruthenian Apostolic Exarchate of Czech Republic

sole ecclesiastical province, the Metropolitanate sui juris, entirely in the United States - Byzantine Catholic Metropolitan Church of Pittsburgh
 Archeparchy of Pittsburgh, head of the particular church, the Metropolitan Archdiocese, with three suffragan dioceses:)
 Ruthenian Catholic Eparchy of Parma
 Ruthenian Catholic Eparchy of Passaic
 Ruthenian Catholic Eparchy of Holy Protection of Mary Phoenix
 Exarchate of Saints Cyril and Methodius of Toronto for Slovak Greek Catholics

further directly dependent on the Metropolitan
 Ruthenian Catholic Eparchy of Mukacheve, in Ukraine, but only for Zakarpattia Oblast

 Slovak Greek Catholic Church (Metropolitan) 
Synod: Council of the Slovak Church

 Slovak Metropolitanate sui juris of Prešov, the head of the particular church and sole province's metropolitan archeparch, with two suffragan eparchies:
 Slovak Catholic Eparchy of Bratislava

 Greek Catholic Church of Croatia and Serbia (no unified structure) 
 Croatian Catholic Eparchy of Križevci, in Croatia, also covering Slovenia and Bosnia-Herzegovina; suffragan in the ecclesiastical province of the Latin Church Metropolitan Archbishop of Zagreb
 exempt: Byzantine Catholic Eparchy of Saint Nicholas of Ruski Krstur, for the Catholics of Byzantine Rite in Serbia

 Italo-Albanian Catholic Church (no unified structure) entirely exempt, i.e. each directly subject to the Holy See Italo-Albanese Eparchy of Piana degli Albanesi, with cathedral see at Palermo, on Sicily
 Italo-Albanese Eparchy of Lungro, with cathedral see at Lungro, near Cosenza in Calabria
 Italo-Albanese Territorial Abbacy of Santa Maria di Grottaferrata

 Albanian Greek Catholic Church (Apostolic Administration) 
 only the Apostolic Administration of Southern Albania, with a pro-cathedral see at Vlorë, which is suffragan to the Ecclesiastical Province of the Latin Church Metropolitan Archbishop of Tiranë–Durrës

 Belarusian Greek Catholic Church (Apostolic Visitation) 
 no diocese presently, only an apostolic visitor for Belarus and another for abroad

 Bulgarian Greek Catholic Church (Episcopal) 
 only the exempt Bulgarian Catholic Apostolic Exarchate of Sofia, which participates in the Latin Church Episcopal conference of Bulgaria Greek Byzantine Catholic Church (no unified structure) 
entirely exempt, i.e. each directly subject to the Holy See:
 Greek Apostolic Exarchate of Greece, with cathedral see in Athens, for Greece
 Greek Apostolic Exarchate of Istanbul, with see in Istanbul, for Turkey

 Macedonian Greek Catholic Church (Episcopal) 
 only the exempt Macedonian Catholic Eparchy of the Assumption of the Blessed Virgin Mary in Strumica-Skopje, with cathedral see in Strumica; vested in the Latin Church bishop of Skopje, also in Macedonia, in the ecclesiastical province of the Metropolitan Archbishop of Vrhbosna/Sarajevo, in Bosnia Russian Greek Catholic Church (no current formalised structure) entirely exempt, i.e. directly subject to the Holy See: Russian Apostolic Exarchate of Harbin, with former cathedral see in Harbin, in and for China Russian Apostolic Exarchate of Russia, vacant since 1951 Alexandrian Rite churches 
 Coptic Catholic Church (Patriarchal) 
 Coptic Catholic Patriarchal See of Alexandria, actually in Cairo; also Metropolitan Archbishop of the church's only ecclesiastical province sui juris, with the following suffragans, all in Egypt:
 Coptic Catholic Eparchy of Alexandria
 Coptic Catholic Eparchy of Assiut
 Coptic Catholic Eparchy of Guizeh
 Coptic Catholic Eparchy of Ismayliah
 Coptic Catholic Eparchy of Luqsor
 Coptic Catholic Eparchy of Minya
 Coptic Catholic Eparchy of Sohag

 Ethiopian Catholic Church (Metropolitan) 
A single ecclesiastical province sui juris, covering Ethiopia (Synod styled Council of the Ethiopian Church)
 Ethiopic Catholic Metropolitanate of Addis Abeba, the only and Metropolitan archeparchy (archdiocese), with three suffragan eparchies (dioceses):
 Ethiopian Catholic Eparchy of Adigrat
 Ethiopian Catholic Eparchy of Bahir Dar–Dessie
 Ethiopian Catholic Eparchy of Emdeber

 Eritrean Catholic Church (Metropolitan) 
A single ecclesiastical province sui juris, covering all and only Eritrea, which has no Latin Church diocese
 Eritrean Catholic Metropolitanate of Asmara, the only archeparchy, with three suffragan eparchies:
 Eritrean Catholic Eparchy of Barentu
 Eritrean Catholic Eparchy of Keren
 Eritrean Catholic Eparchy of Segheneyti

 West Syriac/Syro-Antiochene Rite churches 
 Maronite Catholic Church (Patriarchal) 
 Maronite Catholic Patriarchate of Antioch and the Whole Levant, at Beirut (Lebanon), Chief of the church Exempt, i.e. immediately subject to the Holy See:  In Africa: Maronite Catholic Eparchy of Annunciation of Ibadan, for the Western and Central African states, with cathedral see being Church of Our Lady of the Annunciation, in Ibadan, in Nigeria
 In South America: Maronite Catholic Apostolic Exarchate of Colombia, with pro-cathedral see being Church of Our Lady of Lebanon, in Bogota, in Colombia

Immediately subject to the Patriarch
 In Lebanon:
 Maronite Catholic Archeparchy of Antelias
 Maronite Catholic Eparchy of Baalbek-Deir El Ahmar
 Maronite Catholic Eparchy of Batroun
 Maronite Catholic Archeparchy of Beirut
 Maronite Catholic Eparchy of Byblos
 Maronite Catholic Eparchy of Joubbé, Sarba and Jounieh (sole Suffragan of the Patriarch of Antioch)
 Maronite Catholic Eparchy of Sidon
 Maronite Catholic Archeparchy of Tripoli
 Maronite Catholic Archeparchy of Tyre
 Maronite Catholic Eparchy of Zahleh
 In the Holy Land:
 Maronite Catholic Archeparchy of Haifa and the Holy Land, in Israel whose Archeparch holds the offices of Patriarchal Vicar of: 
 Patriarchal Exarch of the Maronite Catholic Patriarchal Exarchate of Jerusalem and Palestine in the Palestinian Territories and 
 Maronite Catholic Patriarchal Exarchate of Jordan in (Trans)Jordan 
 In Syria:
 Maronite Catholic Archeparchy of Damascus
 Maronite Catholic Archeparchy of Aleppo
 Maronite Catholic Eparchy of Latakia
 In Cyprus: Maronite Catholic Archeparchy of Cyprus in Nicosia
 In Egypt: Maronite Catholic Eparchy of CairoSubject to the Synod in Matters of Liturgical and Particular Law, Otherwise Exempt, i.e. immediately subject to the Holy See and its Roman Congregation for the Eastern Churches: In Europe:
 Maronite Catholic Eparchy of Our Lady of Lebanon of Paris in France
 In North and Central America:
 Maronite Catholic Eparchy of Saint Maron of Montreal, in Canada
 Maronite Catholic Eparchy of Our Lady of Lebanon of Los Angeles in the United States (US West Coast)
 Maronite Catholic Eparchy of Saint Maron of Brooklyn in the United States (US East Coast)
 Maronite Catholic Eparchy of Our Lady of the Martyrs of Lebanon in Mexico in Mexico
 In Oceania: 
 Maronite Catholic Eparchy of Saint Maron of Sydney, in AustraliaSuffragan Eparchies in the ecclesiastical provinces of Latin Metropolitan Archbishops; both in South America: Maronite Catholic Eparchy of San Charbel in Buenos Aires in Argentina, suffragan of the Roman Catholic Archdiocese of Buenos Aires Maronite Catholic Eparchy of Our Lady of Lebanon of São Paulo in Brazil, suffragan of the Roman Catholic Archdiocese of São Paulo(Arch)eparchies immediately subject to the Patriarch of Cilicia, but not part of his province
 Maronite Eparchy of Notre-Dame du Liban de Paris, with cathedral see Cathédrale Notre-Dame du Liban in Paris; also Apostolic Visitor of the Maronites in Western and Northern EuropeEparchies suffragan to a Latin MetropolitanMaronite Eparchy of San Charbel en Buenos Aires, in the province of the Metropolitan Roman Catholic Archdiocese of Buenos Aires Syriac Catholic Church (Patriarchal) 
Synod of the Syriac Catholic ChurchExempt, directly subject to the Holy See Syriac Catholic Apostolic Exarchate of Canada, with cathedral see at Montréal, Québec Syriac Catholic Apostolic Exarchate of Venezuela, with cathedral see at Maracay, Aragua Patriarchal ecclesiastical province
 Syriac Catholic Patriarchate of Antioch, with a cathedral see in Beirut, for Lebanon
 with a single suffragan, for the same proper eparchy (diocese) of the Patriarch, the Syriac Catholic Diocese of Beirut

 Patriarchal exarchates
 Syriac Catholic Patriarchal Exarchate of Basra and the Gulf, for southern Iraq and Kuwait
 Syriac Catholic Patriarchal Exarchate of Jerusalem, with cathedral see in Jerusalem, for the Holy Land (Palestine and Israel) and Jordan
 Syriac Catholic Patriarchal Exarchate of Turkey, for Turkey

 Other (arch)dioceses etc. (none Metropolitan), directly subject to the Patriarch (but not part of his province)
 Syriac Catholic Archeparchy of Baghdad, Archeparchy for central Iraq
 Syriac Catholic Archeparchy of Mosul, Archeparchy for northern Iraq
 Syriac Catholic Archeparchy of Aleppo, Archeparchy for part of Syria (cfr. infra)
 Syriac Catholic Archeparchy of Hassaké–Nisibi, Archeparchy for part of Syria (cfr. infra)
 Syriac Catholic Eparchy of Cairo, for Egypt
 Syriac Territory Dependent on the Patriarch of Sudan and South Sudan, no proper see, but vested in the Cairo Eparch as Protosynkellos for Sudan and South Sudan
 Syriac Catholic Eparchy of Our Lady of Deliverance of Newark, with cathedral see at Bayonne, New Jersey, for the United States

 nominal Metropolitans, without suffragans, both in Syria
 Syriac Metropolitan Archeparchy of Damascus 
 Syriac Metropolitan Archeparchy of Homs

 Syro-Malankara Catholic Church (Major Archiepiscopal) Exempt, immediately subject to the Holy See: Syro-Malankara Catholic Eparchy of Gurgaon, see located near Delhi, serving 22 states of India Syro-Malankara Catholic Eparchy of St. Mary, Queen of Peace, of the United States of America and Canada, with cathedral see at Elmont, New York

Ecclesiastical Province of Trivandrum
 Syro-Malankara Catholic Major Archeparchy of Trivandrum, the Major Archbishop, chief of the particular church Syro-Malankara Catholic Eparchy of Marthandom 
 Syro-Malankara Catholic Eparchy of Mavelikara 
 Syro-Malankara Catholic Eparchy of Parassala
 Syro-Malankara Catholic Eparchy of Pathanamthitta

Ecclesiastical Province of Tiruvalla
 Syro-Malankara Catholic Archeparchy of Tiruvalla 
 Syro-Malankara Catholic Eparchy of Muvattupuzha 
 Syro-Malankara Catholic Eparchy of Bathery 
 Syro-Malankara Catholic Eparchy of PuthurImmediately subject to the Synod of the Syro-Malankara Church: Apostolic Exarchate of Saint Ephrem of Khadki,  with see near Pune, in western India's Maharashtra state, but also serving Goa, Andhra Pradesh, Telangana and parts of Tamil Nadu and Karnataka Armenian Rite: Armenian Catholic Church (Patriarchal) Exempt, directly subject to the Holy See Ordinariate for Armenian-rite Catholics in Eastern Europe, with cathedral see in Giumri, Armenia; actually only for Armenia, Georgia (Gruzinia), Russia and Ukraine Ordinariate for Armenian-rite Catholics in Greece Ordinariate for Armenian-rite Catholics in Romania Armenian Apostolic Exarchate of Latin America and Mexico, Apostolic Exarchate with cathedral see in São Paulo, in Brazil, also for Mexico and UruguayPatriarchal ecclesiastical province of Cilicia (named after Ancient Cilicia, the part of Asia Minor (modern Turkey's Anatolia) where its see was originally)
 Armenian Catholic Patriarchate of Cilicia, the patriarchal see of the Armenian Catholic Church, with cathedral in Beirut, Lebanon, as Metropolitan Archeparch, with four suffragan eparchies
 Armenian Catholic Archeparchy of Beirut, the Proper (arch)eparchy of the Armenian Catholic Patriarch, in Lebanon and Turkey
 Armenian Catholic Eparchy of Alexandria, with cathedral see in Cairo, in and for Egypt, also for Sudan
 Armenian Catholic Eparchy of Isfahan, with cathedral see in Isfahan, in and for Iran
 Armenian Catholic Eparchy of Kameshli, with cathedral see in Qamishli, in and for Syria

other eparchies, immediately subject to the Patriarch of Cilicia, but not part of his province
 Armenian Catholic Archeparchy of Aleppo, Archeparchy (not metropolitan) with cathedral see in Aleppo, in and for part of Syria
 Armenian Catholic Archeparchy of Istanbul, Archeparchy (not metropolitan) with cathedral see in Istanbul (the former Constantinople), in and for Turkey
 Armenian Catholic Archeparchy of Baghdad, Archeparchy (not metropolitan) with cathedral see in Baghdad, in and for Iraq
 Armenian Catholic Archeparchy of Lviv, Archeparchy (not metropolitan) with cathedral see in Lviv, in and for (part of) Ukraine
 Armenian Catholic Patriarchal Exarchate of Damascus, Exarchate with cathedral see in Damascus, in and for part of Syria
 Armenian Catholic Patriarchal Exarchate of Jerusalem and Amman, Exarchate with cathedral see in Jerusalem, in the Holy Land (Israel/ Palestine), also for Jordan
 Armenian Catholic Eparchy of San Gregorio de Narek en Buenos Aires, Eparchy with cathedral see in Buenos Aires, in and for Argentina
 Armenian Catholic Eparchy of Our Lady of Nareg in Glendale, Eparchy with cathedral see in Brooklyn, New York, in the United States, also for Canada
 Armenian Catholic Eparchy of Sainte-Croix-de-Paris, Eparchy with cathedral see in Paris, in and for France

 East Syriac / Syro-Oriental Rite churches 
 Chaldean Catholic Church (Patriarchal) 
 Chaldean Catholic Catholicos-Patriarch of Babylon
 the patriarchal proper Metropolitanate Chaldean Catholic Metropolitan Archdiocese of Baghdad, with its three suffragans Chaldean Catholic Eparchy of Alquoch, Chaldean Catholic Eparchy of Amadiya, Chaldean Catholic Eparchy of Aqra, 
 Chaldean Catholic Metropolitan Archdiocese of Kirkuk (Iraq), Chaldean Catholic Metropolitan Archdiocese of Tehran (Iran), Chaldean Catholic Metropolitan Archdiocese of Urmya with its sole suffragan Chaldean Catholic Eparchy of Salmas,
 Archdioceses of Chaldean Catholic Archdiocese of Ahwaz, Chaldean Catholic Archdiocese of Basra (Iraq), Chaldean Catholic Archdiocese of Diyarbakir, Chaldean Catholic Archdiocese of Erbil, Chaldean Catholic Archeparchy of Mosul (Iraq)
 Eparchies of Chaldean Catholic Eparchy of Aleppo (Syria), Chaldean Catholic Eparchy of Beirut (Lebanon), Chaldean Catholic Eparchy of Cairo (Egypt), Chaldean Catholic Eparchy of Saint Peter The Apostle of San Diego (US), Chaldean Catholic Eparchy of Saint Thomas the Apostle of Detroit (US), Chaldean Catholic Eparchy of Mar Addai of Toronto (Canada), Chaldean Catholic Eparchy of Saint Thomas the Apostle of Sydney (Australia), Chaldean Catholic Eparchy of Sulaimaniya, Chaldean Catholic Eparchy of Zaku
 Territories dependent on the Patriarch: Chaldean Catholic Territory Dependent on the Patriarch of Jerusalem, Chaldean Catholic Territory Dependent on the Patriarch of Jordan

 Syro-Malabar Catholic Church (Major Archiepiscopal) 

Ecclesiastical Province of Eranakulam - Angamaly
 Syro-Malabar Catholic Archdiocese of Eranakulam-Angamaly, the major Archdiocese, head of the particular church, and Metropolitan Archeparchy of Eranakulam-Angamaly
 Syro-Malabar Catholic Eparchy of Idukki (Eparchy of Idukki)
 Syro-Malabar Catholic Eparchy of Kothamangalam

Exempt, immediately subject to the Holy See
 Syro-Malabar Catholic Eparchy of Mississauga, for Canada
 Syro-Malabar Catholic Eparchy of Faridabad, with see near Delhi, also serves Haryana, Punjab, Himachal Pradesh, Jammu and Kashmir and parts of Uttar Pradesh
 Syro-Malabar Catholic Eparchy of Hosur Syro-Malabar Catholic Eparchy of Shamshabad St. Thomas Syro-Malabar Catholic Eparchy of Chicago, with cathedral see at Bellwood, Illinois, for the USA; also Syro-Malabar Apostolic visitator in Canada
 Syro-Malabar Catholic Eparchy of Great Britain, with cathedral see at Preston, Lancashire, England; for England, Scotland & Wales
 Syro-Malabar Catholic Eparchy of Saint Thomas the Apostle of Melbourne, for Australia, with cathedral see at Melbourne, Victoria state; also Syro-Malabar Apostolic visitator in New Zealand

Ecclesiastical Province of Changanassery
 Metropolitan Archdiocese (Archeparchy) of Changanassery
 Syro-Malabar Catholic Eparchy of Kanjirappally
 Syro-Malabar Catholic Eparchy of Palai
 Syro-Malabar Catholic Eparchy of Thuckalay

Ecclesiastical Province of Tellicherry
 Syro-Malabar Catholic Archeparchy of Tellicherry
 Syro-Malabar Catholic Eparchy of Belthangady
 Syro-Malabar Catholic Eparchy of Bhadravathi
 Syro-Malabar Catholic Eparchy of Mananthavady
 Syro-Malabar Catholic Eparchy of Mandya
 Syro-Malabar Catholic Eparchy of Thamarassery

Ecclesiastical Province of Thrissur
 Syro-Malabar Catholic Archeparchy of Thrissur
 Syro-Malabar Catholic Eparchy of Irinjalakuda
 Syro-Malabar Catholic Eparchy of Palghat
 Syro-Malabar Catholic Eparchy of Ramanathapuram

Archdiocese of Kottayam
 Syro-Malabar Catholic Archeparchy of Kottayam (Archeparchy of Kottayam, nominal Metropolitan, no suffragan)Syro-Malabar eparchies, suffragans of Roman Catholic (Latin Church) Indian Metropolitan archbishops, hence part of their mixed-rite provinces under Agra Syro-Malabar Catholic Eparchy of Bijnor Syro-Malabar Catholic Eparchy of Gorakhpur under Bhopal Syro-Malabar Catholic Eparchy of Sagar Syro-Malabar Catholic Eparchy of Satna Syro-Malabar Catholic Eparchy of Ujjain under Bombay Syro-Malabar Catholic Eparchy of Kalyan, see located near Bombay, but serves all of Maharashtra state under Gandhinagar Syro-Malabar Catholic Eparchy of Rajkot under Hyderabad Syro-Malabar Catholic Eparchy of Adilabad under Nagpur Syro-Malabar Catholic Eparchy of Chanda under Raipur Syro-Malabar Catholic Eparchy of Jagdalpur''

Other and various types of Catholic sees and jurisdictions 

 List of Catholic dioceses (alphabetical)
 List of Catholic archdioceses
 Titular (arch)episcopal sees
 List of Catholic titular sees (A)
 List of Catholic titular sees (B-K)
 List of Catholic titular sees (L-M)
 List of Catholic titular sees (N-S)
 List of Catholic titular sees (T-Z)
 List of Catholic military dioceses
 List of Catholic apostolic administrations
 List of Catholic apostolic vicariates
 List of Eastern Catholic exarchates
 List of Catholic apostolic prefectures
 List of Catholic territorial prelatures
 List of Catholic missions sui juris

See also

Eastern churches 

Coptic Catholic dioceses
Ethiopic Catholic dioceses
List of Armenian dioceses
List of Chaldean dioceses
Macedonian Catholic Church
Maronite dioceses
Melkite Greek Catholic dioceses
Ruthenian Greek Catholic dioceses
Syriac Catholic dioceses
Syro-Malabar Catholic dioceses
Ukrainian Greek Catholic dioceses

Notes

References

External links
 Catholic-hierarchy.org
 GCatholic (here: dioceses by type)
 Federation of Asian Bishops' Conferences

Structured
Structured